= Technology education =

Education in processes and use of technology

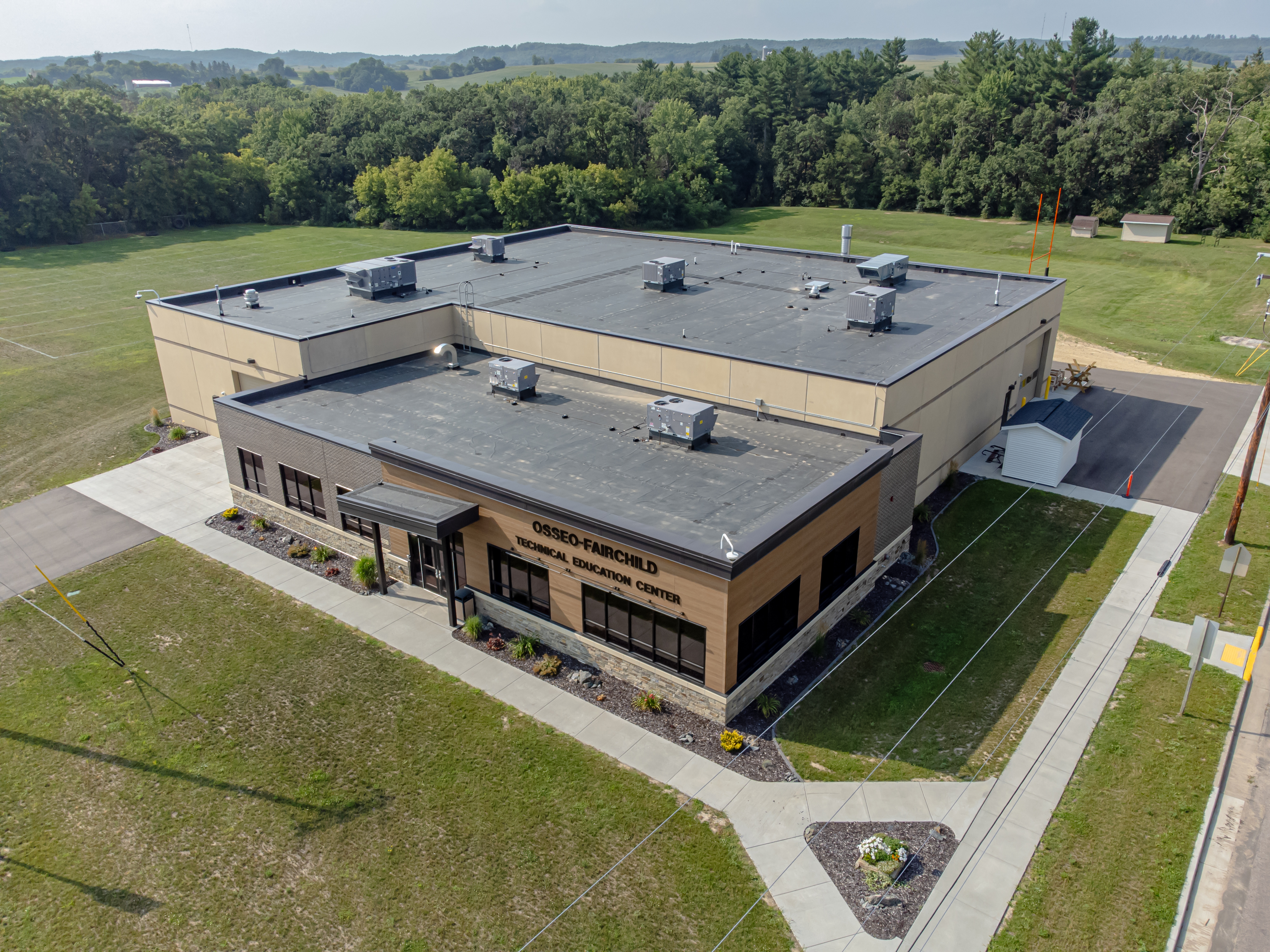
Osseo-Fairchild Technical Education Center

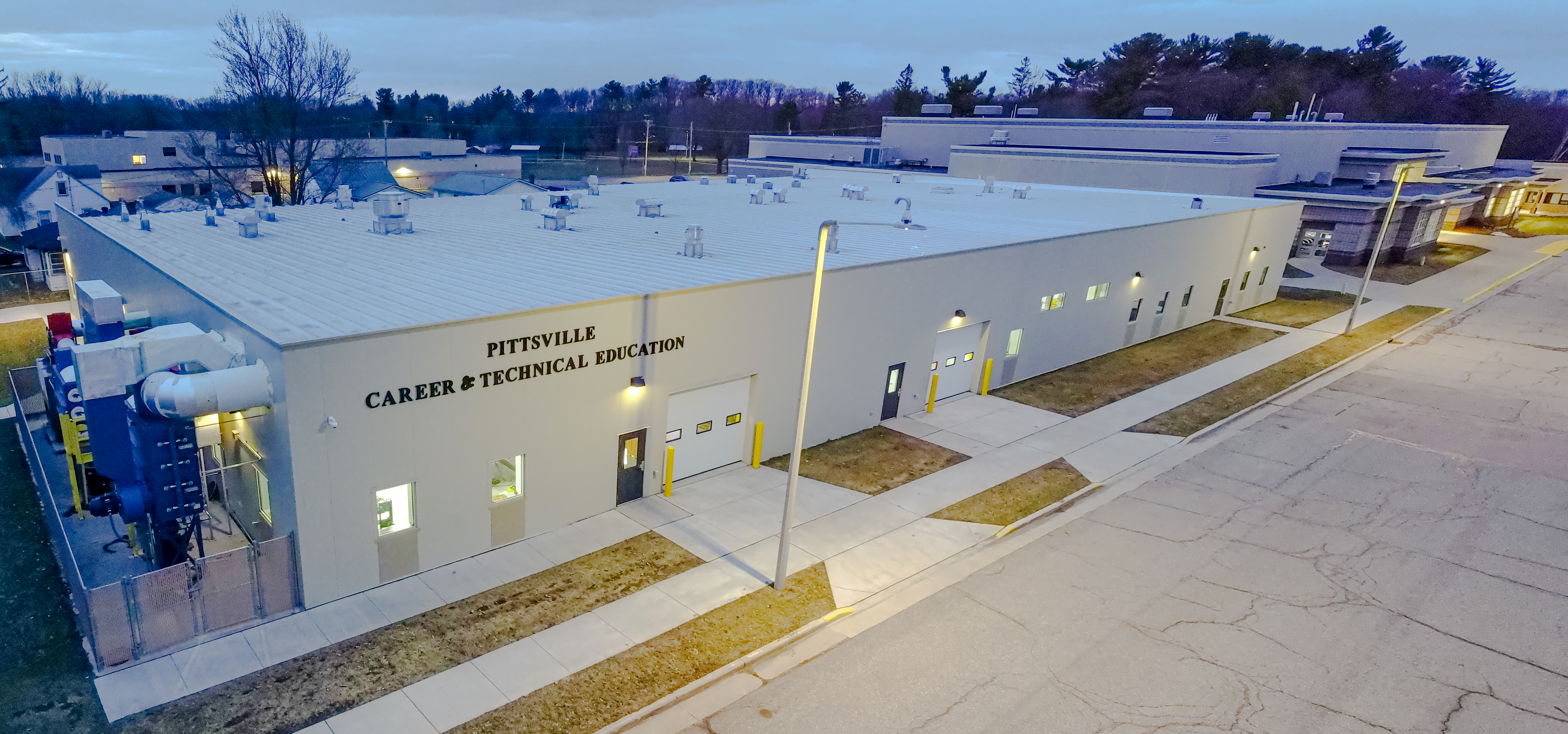
Pittsville Career and Technical Education Center

Technology education is the study of technology, in which students "learn about the processes and knowledge related to technology". As a field of study, it covers the human's ability to shape and change the physical world to meet needs, by manipulating materials and tools with techniques. It addresses the disconnect between wide usage and the lack of knowledge about technical components of technologies used and how to fix them. This emergent discipline seeks to contribute to the learners' overall scientific and technological literacy, and technacy.

Technology education should not be confused with educational technology. Educational technology focuses on a narrower subset of technology use that centers on technology in and for education, as opposed to technology education's focus on technology's use in general.

== History ==
Technology education is an offshoot of the Industrial Arts tradition in the United States and the Craft teaching or vocational education in other countries. In 1980, through what was called the "Futuring Project", the name of "industrial arts education" was changed to be "technology education" in New York State; the goal of this movement was to increase students' technological literacy. Since the nature of technology education is significantly different from its predecessor, Industrial Arts, teachers underwent in-service education in the mid-1980s while a Technology Training Network was also established by the New York State Education Department (NYSED).

In Sweden, technology as a new subject emerged from the tradition of craft subjects, while in countries like Taiwan and Australia, its elements are discernible in historical vocational programs.

In the 21st century, Mars suit design was utilized as a topic for technology education. Technical education is entirely different from general education

== Current state of technology education ==
TeachThought, a private entity, described technology education as being in the "status of childhood and bold experimentation." A survey of teachers across the United States by an independent market research company found out that 86 percent of teacher-respondents agree that technology must be used in the classroom. 96 percent say it promotes engagement of students, and 89% agree technology improves student outcomes. Technology is present in many education systems. As of July 2018, American public schools provide one desktop computer for every five students and spend over $3 billion annually on digital content. In school year 2015–2016, the government conducted more state-standardized testing for elementary and middle levels through digital platforms instead of the traditional pen and paper method.

The digital revolution offers fresh learning prospects. Students can learn online even if they are not in the classroom. Advancement in technology entails new approaches of combining present and future technological improvements and incorporating these innovations into the public education system. With technology incorporated into everyday learning, this creates a new environment with new personalized and blended learning. Students are able to complete work based on their own needs and benefit from the flexibility of individualized study, which enhances the overall learning experience. The technology space in education is huge. It advances and changes rapidly. In the United Kingdom, computer technology helped elevate standards in different schools to confront various challenges. The UK adopted the "Flipped Classroom" concept after it became popular in the United States. The idea is to reverse conventional teaching methods by delivering instruction online and outside traditional classrooms.

In Europe, the European Commission espoused a Digital Education Plan in January 2018. The program consists of 11 initiatives that support utilization of technology and digital capabilities in education development. The Commission also adopted an action plan called the Staff Working Document which details its strategy in implementing digital education. This plan includes three priorities and formulates measures to assist European Union member states in tackling all related concerns. The whole framework will support the European Qualifications Framework for Lifelong Learning and European Classification of Skills, Competences, Qualifications, and Occupations.

In East Asia, The World Bank co-sponsored a yearly (two-day) international symposium In October 2017 with South Korea's Ministry of Education, Science, and Technology and the World Bank to support education and ICT concerns for industry practitioners and senior policymakers. Participants plan and discuss issues in the use of new technologies for schools within the region.

== See also ==
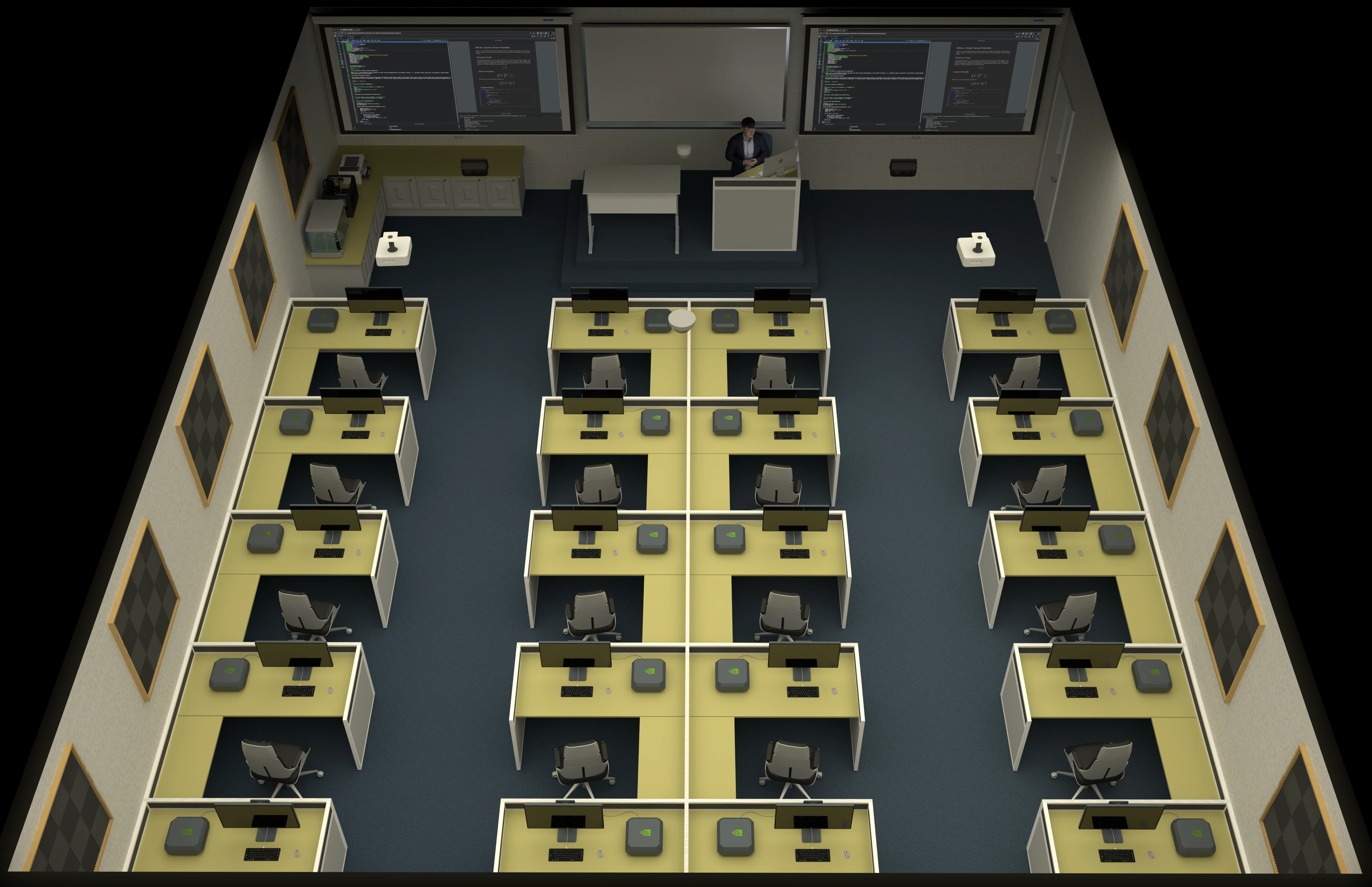
3D design of desk cubicles to get power to the desk and computers in the classroom for computer-based mathematics, CAD, CAM, BIM, computer-aided engineering, computer programming, animation software, science software applications, and more.

- List of construction trades
- Tradesperson
- Technician
- Association for Career and Technical Education
- Career and Technical Education
- Computer-based mathematics education
- Computational education
- Creative arts
- Technological literacy
- Technical school
- Tech certificate
- Science, technology, engineering, and mathematics (STEM)
- List of educational software
- List of free educational software
- List of school facilities/areas
