= Career and technical education =

Educational programs combining academic and technical skills for workforce preparation

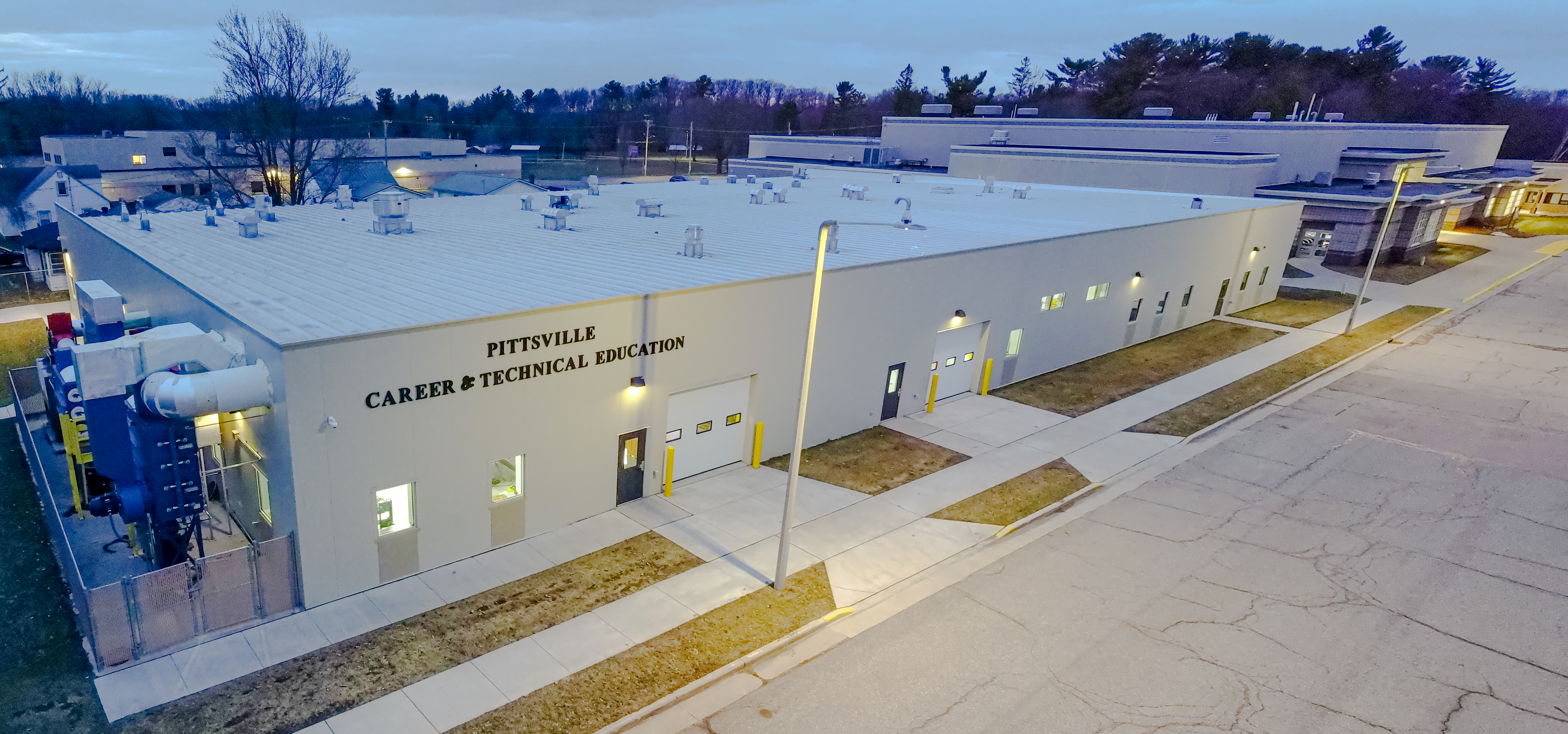
Pittsville Career and Technical Education Center

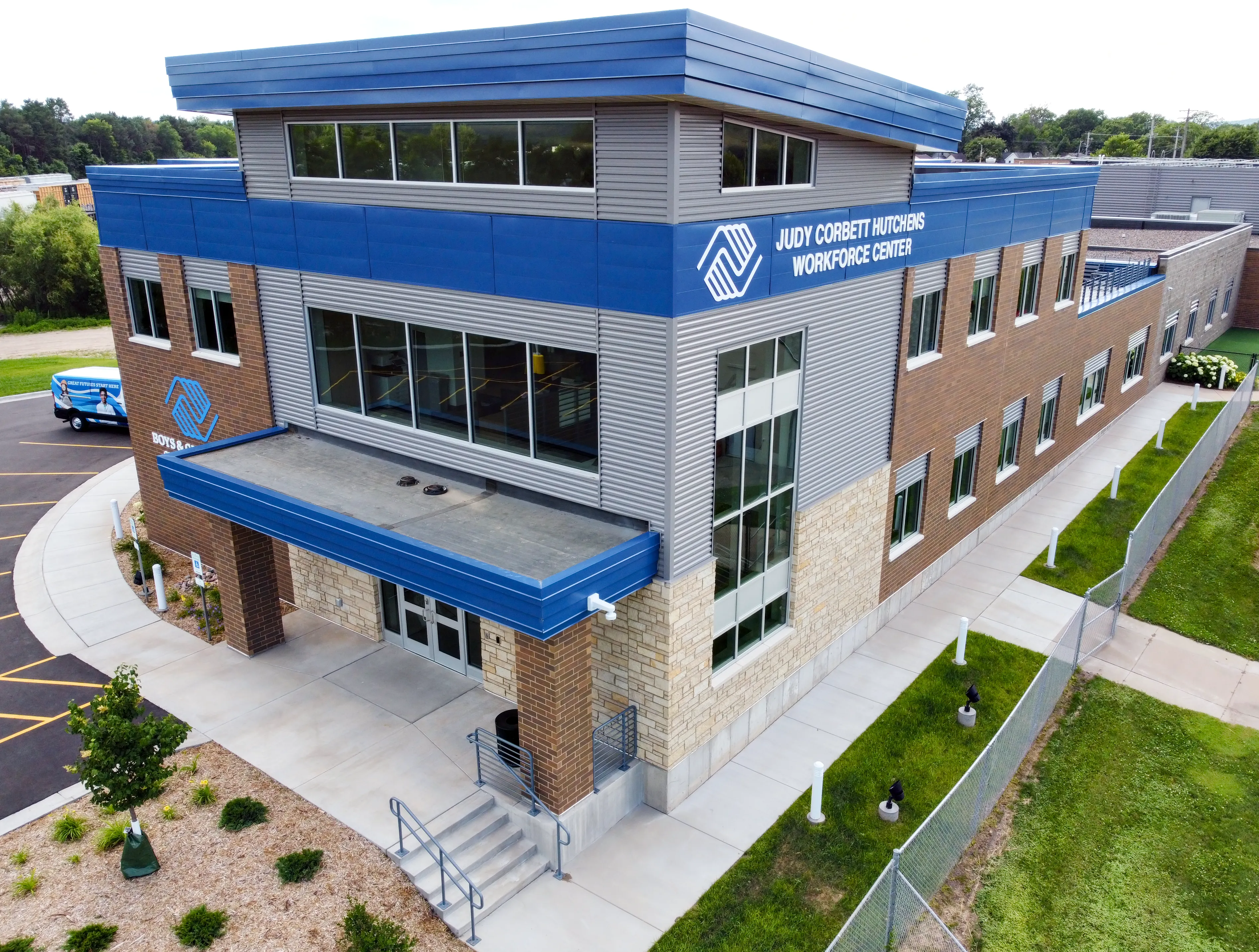
Boys and girls club workforce center

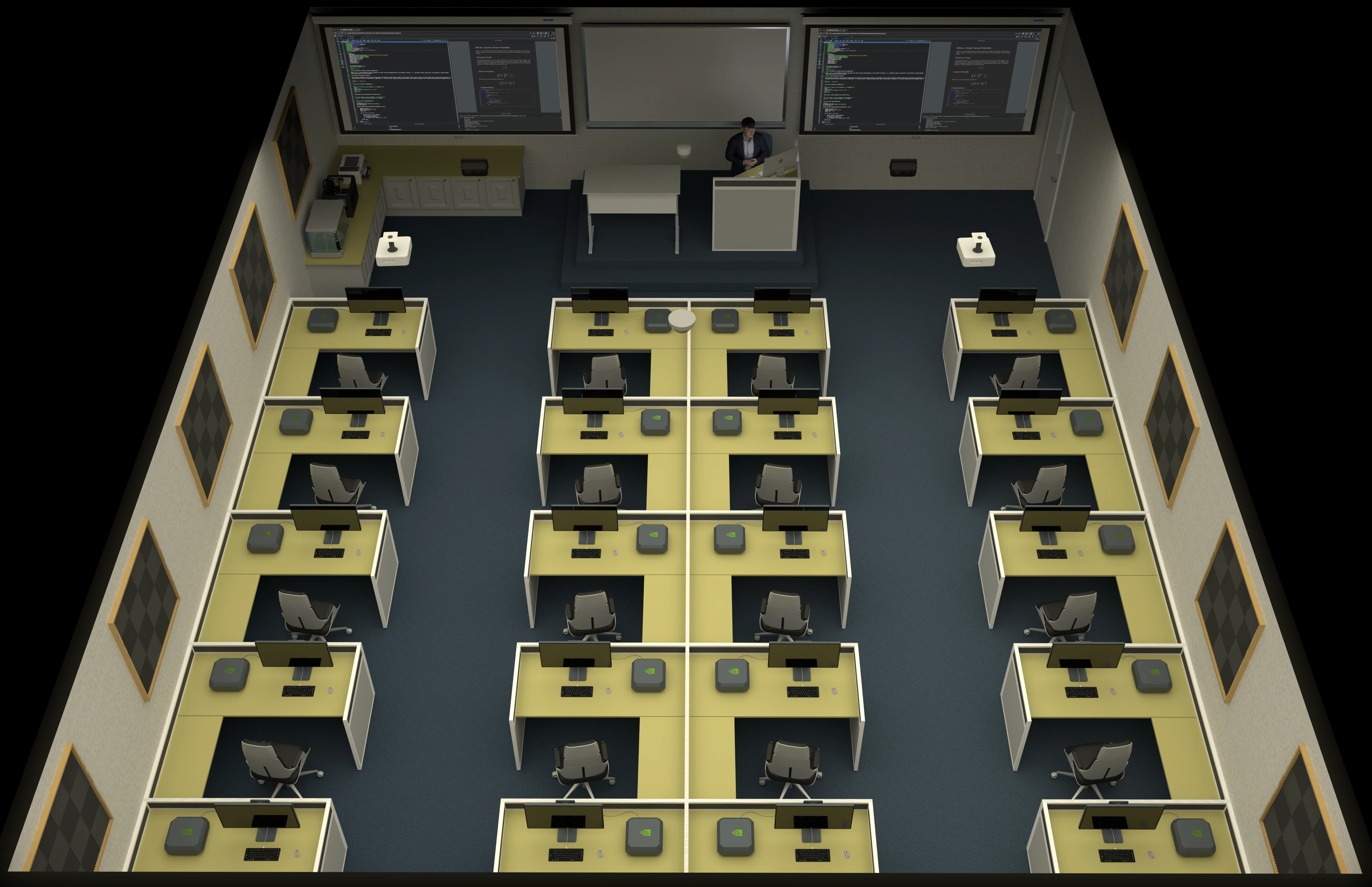
3D design of desk cubicles to get power to the desk and computers in the classroom for computer-based mathematics, CAD, CAM, BIM, computer-aided engineering, computer programming, animation software, science software applications, and more.

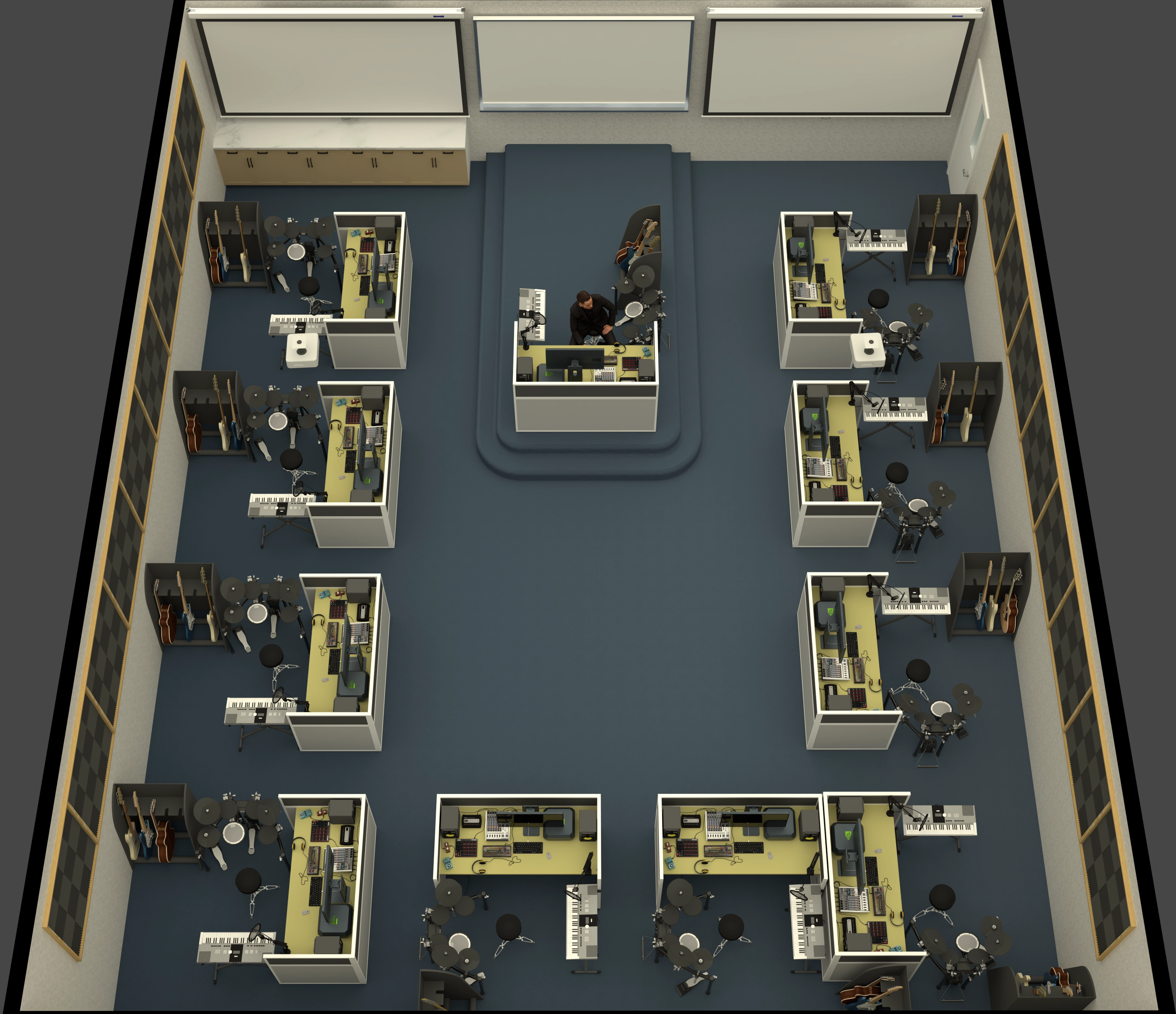
Digital audio workstation classroom with an electric drum set, electric keyboard, drum machine, microphone, headphones, electric guitar, bass guitar, electric acoustic guitar, and other electronic musical equipment.

Career and technical education (CTE) is an educational approach to teaching technical skills that lead to careers for middle, high, and post secondary students. Compared to vocational education which is only taught in post secondary scenarios and is very specific to one career track, CTE can be broad in range from medical, business, sales, finance, IT, STEM, manufacturing, logistics, computer-based mathematics, political science, government, law, agriculture, construction, trades, craftsman,cosmetology, culinary, creative arts, music, to audiovisual technology. The Federal Government of the United States has invested $1.462 billion in 2023 and States have invested billions to renovate classrooms, spaces, and build dedicated buildings for the equipment, supplies, tools, software, and hardware to accommodate CTE.

== List of career and technical education skills ==
=== Trades ===
- Carpentry – woodworking, framing, doors/windows, drywall, insulation, flooring, siding, renovation, cabinetry, furniture.
- Cosmetology – Hair, Skin, Nails
- Plumbing – plumbing fixtures, piping and plumbing fitting, water heater, steamfitter, GreenPlumbers, and drain cleaner.
- Electrician – wiring, light fixture/major appliance, solar power installation, electronics technician, electric motor/generator technician, lineworker.
- Welding – MIG, TIG, stick, list of welding types, welding joints, welding symbols, and metalworking.
- Masonry – concrete work, bricks/blocks/stones, troweling, and tiling.
- HVAC – heating, ventilation, air conditioning, and duct work.
- Painting – staining, wallpaper, paint mixing, plasterwork, and spackling paste.
- Roofing – shingles, standing seam metal roof, corrugated metal roof, solar roofs, rubber shingles, rain gutters.
- Mechanic – auto mechanic/restoration/scrapping, air conditioning, aircraft technician, boiler, millwright/industrial mechanic.
- Metal fabrication – machinist, lathes, milling, drilling, grinding, and CNC machining.
- Sewing – machine sewing, hand stitching, embroidery, tailor, quilting, fashion design, costume design, 3D clothes modeling, upholstery, knitting, tapestry, crochet.
- Culinary chef – baker, meat cutter\fishmonger, deli, cheesemonger, sushi itamae, and cook.
- Telecommunications technician – tower technician, directional boring, fiber-optic/coaxial, utility pole technician, satellite dish installer.
- Automation technician – PLCs, instrumentation calibration, assembly/production line, industrial installation and maintenance.
- Semiconductor technician
- Aviation – flight training, list of flight simulators, air traffic control, fixed-wing, rotary-wing, UAV, 107 pilots license.
- Energy Technologies -- Electrician, Welder, Construction, solar installer, and engineer.

=== Computers ===
- Computer programming - languages, libraries, competitive programming, list of online IDEs, and source code editors.
- CAD/CAM/BIM – list of 3D modeling software, List of computer-aided manufacturing software, List of BIM software, CNC machining/3D printing/3D fabrication, and 3D rendering.
- Video editing – list of video editing software, filmmaking, visual effects, CGI, and List of 3D animation software.
- Digital art – 2D graphics software, animation software, graphics tablets, styluses, List of digital art software, digital sculpting.
- Digital photography/Videography – digital camera, aerial photography, digital photo editing software, list of video editing software.
- Information technology (IT)
- Spreadsheets – CSV (file format), graphs, charts, bookkeeping, list of spreadsheet software, List of relational database management systems.
- Digital media – radio/podcast, YouTuber, video production, visual effects/sound effects/sound design, digital audio editors, studio.
- Music studio – digital audio workstation, audio engineering, list of music software, electronic drum set, electronic keyboard, electric guitar, drum machine, digital music technology.

=== Healthcare ===
- Medical imaging – Xray, CT scan, MRIs, ECGs, nuclear medicine, and ultrasound.
- Medical laboratory tests
- Health informatics
- Nursing
- Surgical stitches
- Biomedical sciences
- Biomedical equipment technician
- Emergency medical services – emergency medical technician (EMT), paramedic, first responder.
- Dental hygienist

=== Computational science ===
- Biotechnology - list of open-source bioinformatics software, computational genomics, pharmaceutical sciences.
- Computational biology - biosimulation, list of genetic engineering software, List of protein structure prediction software.
- Computational chemistry - software for molecular mechanics modeling, nucleic acid simulation, molecular design software.
- Computational physics - quantum chemistry and solid-state physics software, astrophysics software, Open Source Physics.
- Geoinformatics - GIS software, surveying, remote sensing, photogrammetry, geovisualization, technical geography, geostatistics.
- Electronics - open-source EDA software and free simulators, avionics, robotics, OpenRISC, sensors, silicon devices.
- Aerospace - aeronautics, astronautics, space flight simulation games, list of flight simulator video games, aircraft design process.
- Computational materials science - materials informatics, computational thermodynamics, molecular dynamics, molecule editing software, molecular mechanics modeling software, list of software for nanostructures modeling, finite element analysis software.

=== Computational engineering ===
- Biomedical engineering – biomechanics, genetic engineering, pharmaceutical, medical imaging, bioinstrumentation, tissue.
- Materials engineering – chemical, petroleum, biochemical, thermochemistry, chemical process simulators, nanoengineering.
- Biological engineering – synthetic biology, biological systems, biotechnology, agricultural, computational genomics, bioinformatics.
- Construction engineering – civil engineering, structural, transportation, surveying, architectural, construction estimating software.
- Computer engineering – software, data engineering, network engineering, processor / PCB design, cyber security, cryptography.
- Electrical engineering – electronics engineering, power systems / energy, telecommunications, instrumentation, signal processing.
- Environmental engineering – water / wastewater treatment, recycling, ecological, urban planning, sustainable design.
- Industrial engineering – manufacturing, operations, component, systems, life-cycle, logistics and supply chain.
- Mechanical engineering – automotive, marine, aerospace, robotics, mechatronics, biomechanical, turbomachinery, energy.
- Design engineer – architectural, automotive, CAD technician, CAM, BIM, CAE, MEP, industrial design, design for additive manufacturing, integrated circuit design, PCB design, interior architect, naval architecture, packaging engineering, UX, UI.
- Artificial intelligence engineering – machine learning, computer vision, list of artificial intelligence projects, comparison of deep learning software.

=== Computer-based mathematics ===
- Computer algebra - computer algebra systems, list of computer algebra systems, free computer algebra software.
- Computational geometry - list of interactive geometry software, list of information graphics software, free plotting software.
- Computational statistics - list of statistical software, comparison of statistical packages, data mining software, analytics.
- Data science - list of numerical-analysis software, machine learning software, list of open-source data science software.
- Computational science - computational physics, chemistry, biomathematics, economics, list of computer simulation software.
- Mathematical programming - linear, nonlinear, integer, linear algebra libraries, list of numerical libraries and languages.
- Engineering mathematics - computational engineering, Mathcad, list of computer-aided engineering software.
- Mathematical notation software - Comparison of TeX editors, TeX, LaTeX, KaTeX, AsciiMath, GNU TeXmacs, MathJax, MathML.
- Algorithms - list of algorithms, algorithm design, analysis of algorithms, algorithm engineering, list of data structures.
- Cryptography - cryptography algorithms, comparison of cryptography libraries.
- Mathematical art - mathematical visualizations, fractal art, parametric surfaces, algorithmic art, platonic solids, simulations, procedural generation, ray tracing, List of mathematical art software.
- Software calculators — GeoGebra, Desmos, Qalculate!, Maxima, Grapher.

=== Business and finance ===
- Accounting – bookkeeping, financial statements, tax preparation, auditing, forensic accounting, payroll, accounts payable / receivable, CPA, comparison of accounting software.
- Entrepreneurship – business plan, business law, business administration, startup accelerator / incubator, balance sheet, business analytics, crowdfunding, investors.
- Finance – financial forecasting, price charts analysis, List of information graphics software, open-source finance software, financial literacy.
- Real estate – real estate investing, agent / broker, development, urban planning, landlord–tenant law, zoning laws, appraisals, contracts, renovation.

=== Law ===
- Criminal law – criminal defense, prosecution, defamation, homicide, assault, theft, drug offenses, sentencing.
- Civil law – contract law, tort law, property law, family law, labor law, consumer protection, personal injury.
- Corporate law – corporate governance, mergers and acquisitions, intellectual property, business law, securities law.
- International law – human rights law, international trade law, international humanitarian law, diplomatic law, law of the sea.
- Family law – divorce, child custody, adoption, domestic violence, spousal support, paternity.
- Immigration law – visa, asylum, naturalization, deportation, immigrant rights.
- Intellectual property law – patent law, copyright law, trademark law, trade secrets, licensing.
- Tax law – income tax, corporate tax, estate tax, sales tax, tax evasion, tax compliance.
- Employment law – labor rights, workplace discrimination, unemployment insurance, employee benefits.
- Criminal procedure – arrest, search and seizure, forensic science, trial, plea bargaining, appeals.
- Constitutional law – constitutional rights, judicial review, due process, federalism, democratic-republic, constitutional amendments.
- Computational law – legal informatics, automated reasoning, smart contracts, legal expert systems, regulatory technology, jurimetrics.
- Legal writing – legal research, legal briefs, memoranda, judicial opinions, legal citation, persuasive writing, legal drafting, contracts, legal analysis, court reporter, Will and testament.

== See also ==
- Academy
- Apprenticeship / Internship
- Association for Career and Technical Education and Technology Student Association
- Aviation Career & Technical Education High School in New York
- Connecticut Technical High School System
- Career and technical student organization
- Career Clusters
- Career Education Colleges and Universities
- Career Pathways
- Carl D. Perkins Vocational and Technical Education Act
- Community school
- Computational education
- Dual enrollment
- Education
- Lists of academic journals
- List of educational software
- List of online educational resources
- List of open-source hardware projects
- National Center for Construction Education and Research
- On-the-job training
- Professional certification and licensing
- School-to-work transition
- Skill building, skill sharing, and upskilling
- SkillsUSA
- Smith–Hughes Act – National Vocational Education Act of 1917
- Technology education
- Workforce development
