= Susan Empson =

American mathematics educator

- Born: Susan Baker Empson
- Education: Queen's College, Charlotte; Columbia University; University of Wisconsin–Madison (PhD)
- Scientific career
- Institutions: University of Texas at Austin; University of Missouri
- Thesis: The Development of Children's Fraction Thinking in a First-grade Classroom

Susan Baker Empson is an American scholar of mathematics education whose work includes longitudinal studies of children's mathematical development, the use of Cognitively Guided Instruction in mathematics education, analyses of childhood understanding of the concept of fractions, and research on the professional development of mathematics educators. She is a professor emerita in the Department of Learning, Teaching, and Curriculum at the University of Missouri, where she held the Richard Miller endowed chair of mathematics education.

== Education and career ==
Empson majored in art at Queens College, Charlotte in North Carolina, with a minor in mathematics; she graduated summa cum laude in 1983. After two years teaching mathematics in Morocco through the Peace Corps, she became a mathematics teacher at A. Philip Randolph Campus High School in New York City in 1987. While in New York, she also went to Teachers College, Columbia University for a master's degree in mathematics education and a minor in educational technology, completed in 1988.

In 1990, she moved to the University of Wisconsin–Madison for continuing graduate study in mathematics education. She completed her Ph.D. there in 1994, with a minor in cognitive science in education. Her dissertation, The Development of Children's Fraction Thinking in a First-grade Classroom, was supervised by Thomas P. Carpenter. She also worked at the university as a lecturer from 1993 to 1995, and stayed on as a post-doctoral researcher from 1994 to 1996.

In 1996, she took a faculty position at the University of Texas at Austin, as an assistant professor in the Department of Curriculum and Instruction. She remained there until 2016, progressing through the faculty ranks, until retiring in 2016 as professor emerita. In that year she moved to the University of Missouri, as a professor in the Department of Learning, Teaching, and Curriculum, Richard Miller endowed chair of mathematics education, and associate director of the Institute for Reimagining and Researching STEM Education. She has since retired again, as professor emerita.

== Selected publications ==
=== Books ===
- Carpenter, T. P.; Fennema, E.; Franke, M.; Levi, L.; Empson, S. B. (1999), Children's Mathematics: Cognitively Guided Instruction, Heinemann; 2nd ed., 2015
- Empson, S. B.; Levi, L. (2011), Extending Children's Mathematics: Fractions and Decimals, Heinemann

=== Articles ===
- Fennema, Elizabeth; Carpenter, Thomas P.; Franke, Megan L.; Levi, Linda; Jacobs, Victoria R.; Empson, Susan B. (July 1996), "A longitudinal study of learning to use children's thinking in mathematics instruction", Journal for Research in Mathematics Education, 27 (4): 403–434, doi:10.5951/jresematheduc.27.4.0403, JSTOR 749875
- Carpenter, Thomas P.; Franke, Megan L.; Jacobs, Victoria R.; Fennema, Elizabeth; Empson, Susan B. (January 1998), "A longitudinal study of invention and understanding in children's multidigit addition and subtraction", Journal for Research in Mathematics Education, 29 (1): 3–20, doi:10.5951/jresematheduc.29.1.0003, JSTOR 749715
- Empson, Susan B. (September 1999), "Equal sharing and shared meaning: the development of fraction concepts in a first-grade classroom", Cognition and Instruction, 17 (3): 283–342, doi:10.1207/s1532690xci1703_3, JSTOR 3233836
- Empson, Susan B. (July 2003), "Low-performing students and teaching fractions for understanding: an interactional analysis", Journal for Research in Mathematics Education, 34 (4): 305–343, doi:10.2307/30034786, JSTOR 30034786
- Roschelle, Jeremy; Shechtman, Nicole; Tatar, Deborah; Hegedus, Stephen; Hopkins, Bill; Empson, Susan; Knudsen, Jennifer; Gallagher, Lawrence P. (December 2010), "Integration of technology, curriculum, and professional development for advancing middle school mathematics", American Educational Research Journal, 47 (4): 833–878, doi:10.3102/0002831210367426, JSTOR 40928357, S2CID 55546036
- Jacobs, Victoria R.; Empson, Susan B. (August 2015), "Responding to children's mathematical thinking in the moment: an emerging framework of teaching moves", ZDM, 48 (1–2): 185–197, doi:10.1007/s11858-015-0717-0, S2CID 255428451
