= Mathematics education =

Teaching and learning of mathematics

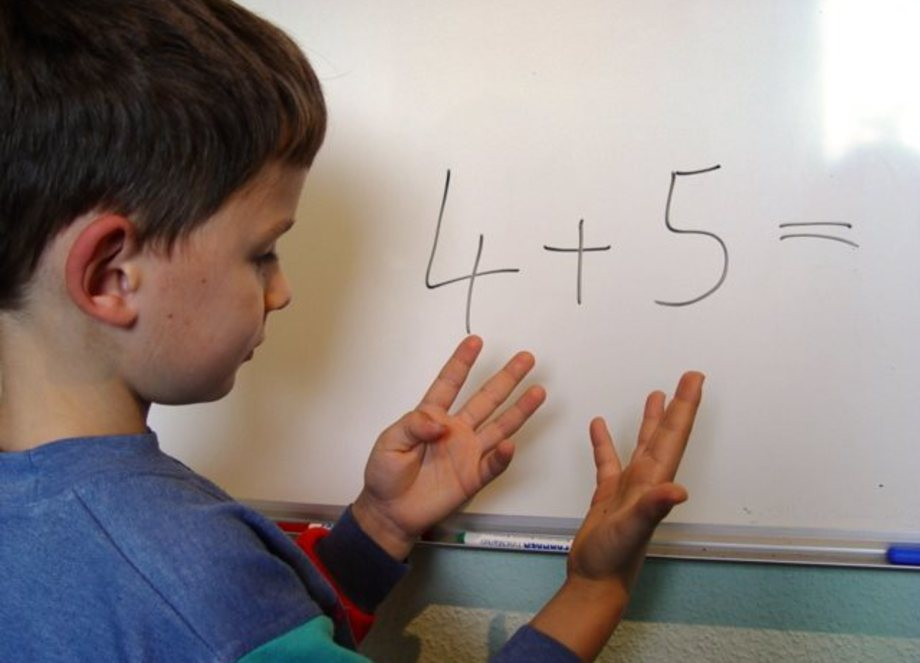
A child calculating with his fingers (2006)

In contemporary education, mathematics education (known in Europe as the didactics or pedagogy of mathematics) is the practice of teaching, learning, and carrying out scholarly research into the transfer of mathematical knowledge.

Although research into mathematics education is primarily concerned with the tools, methods, and approaches that facilitate practice or the study of practice, it also covers an extensive field of study encompassing a variety of different concepts, theories and methods. National and international organisations regularly hold conferences and publish literature in order to improve mathematics education.

== Objectives ==
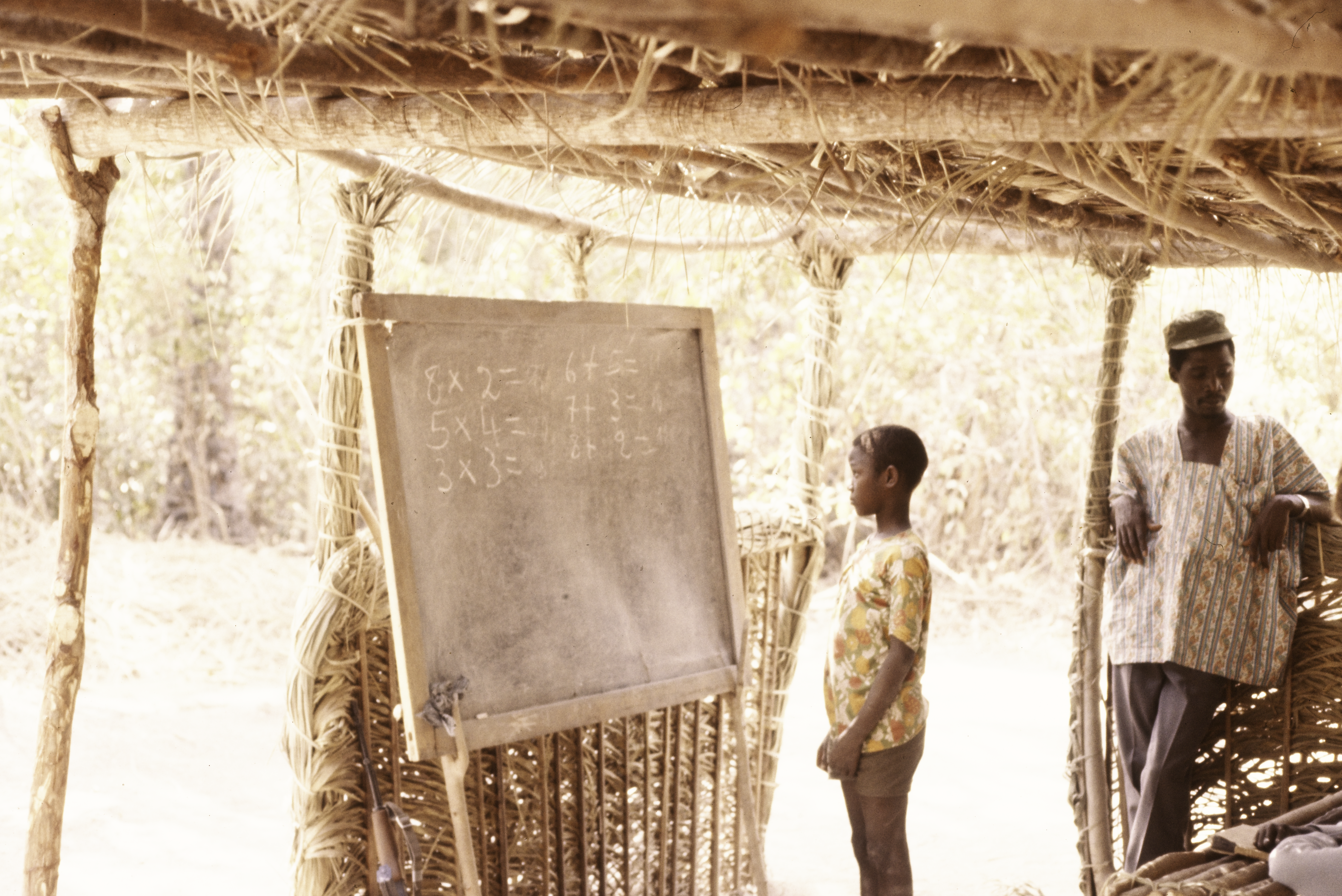
Boy doing sums, Guinea-Bissau, 1974

At different times and in different cultures and countries, mathematics education has attempted to achieve a variety of different objectives. These objectives have included:

- The teaching and learning of basic numeracy skills to all students
- The teaching of practical mathematics (arithmetic, elementary algebra, plane and solid geometry, trigonometry, probability, statistics) to most students, to equip them to follow a trade or craft and to understand mathematics commonly used in news and the Internet (such as percentages, charts, probability, and statistics)
- The teaching of abstract mathematical concepts (such as set and function) at an early age
- The teaching of selected areas of mathematics (such as Euclidean geometry) as an example of an axiomatic system and a model of deductive reasoning
- The teaching of selected areas of mathematics (such as calculus) as an example of the intellectual achievements of the modern world
- The teaching of advanced mathematics to those students who wish to follow a career in science, technology, engineering, and mathematics (STEM) fields
- The teaching of heuristics and other problem-solving strategies to solve non-routine problems
- The teaching of mathematics in social sciences and actuarial sciences, as well as in some selected arts under liberal arts education in liberal arts colleges or universities

== Methods ==
The method or methods used in any particular context are largely determined by the objectives that the relevant educational system is trying to achieve. Methods of teaching mathematics include the following:

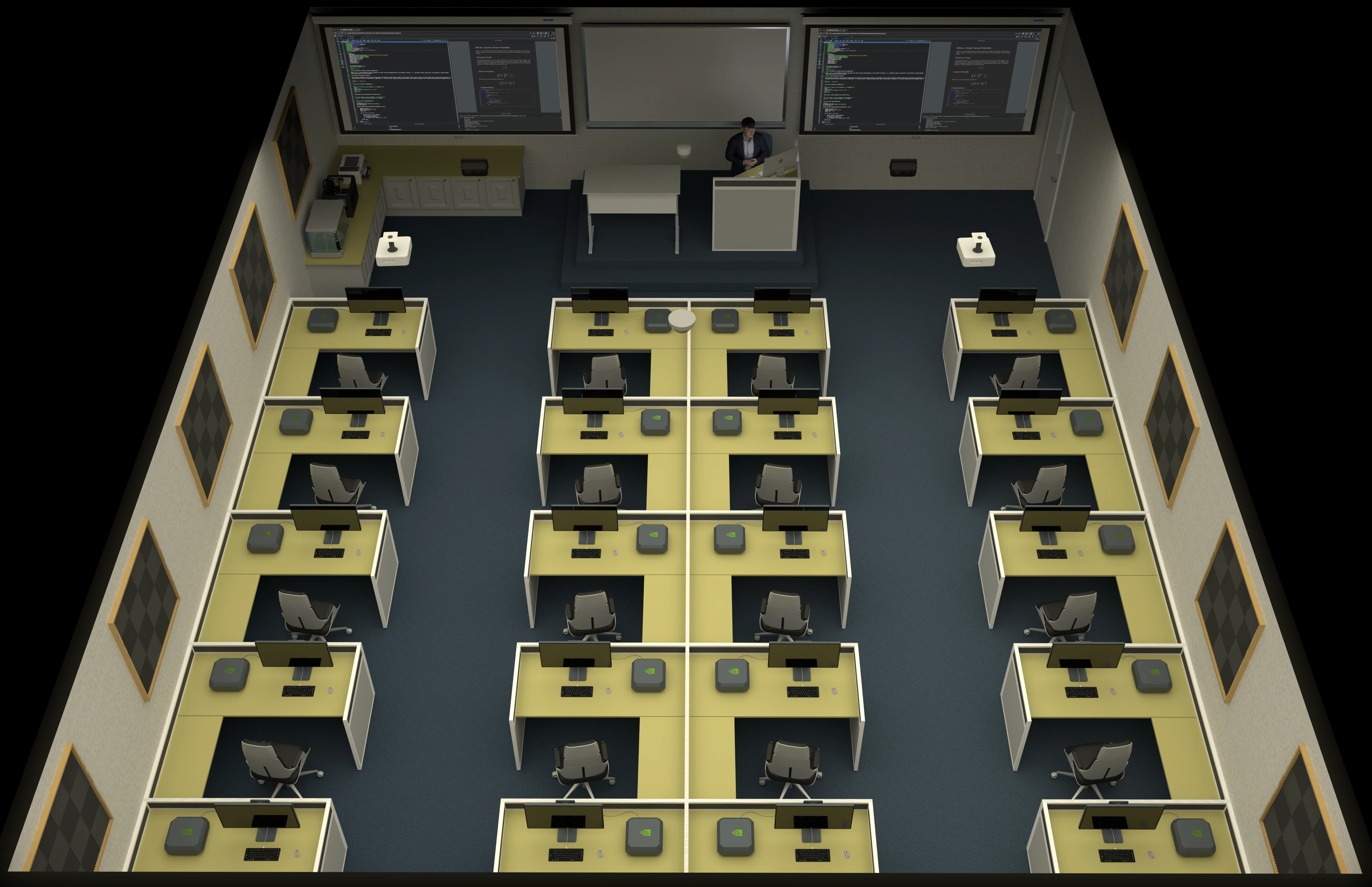
3D sketch of desk cubicles to get computers in the classroom for computer-based mathematics, CAD, CAM, BIM, computer-aided engineering, computer programming, animation software, science software applications, and more.

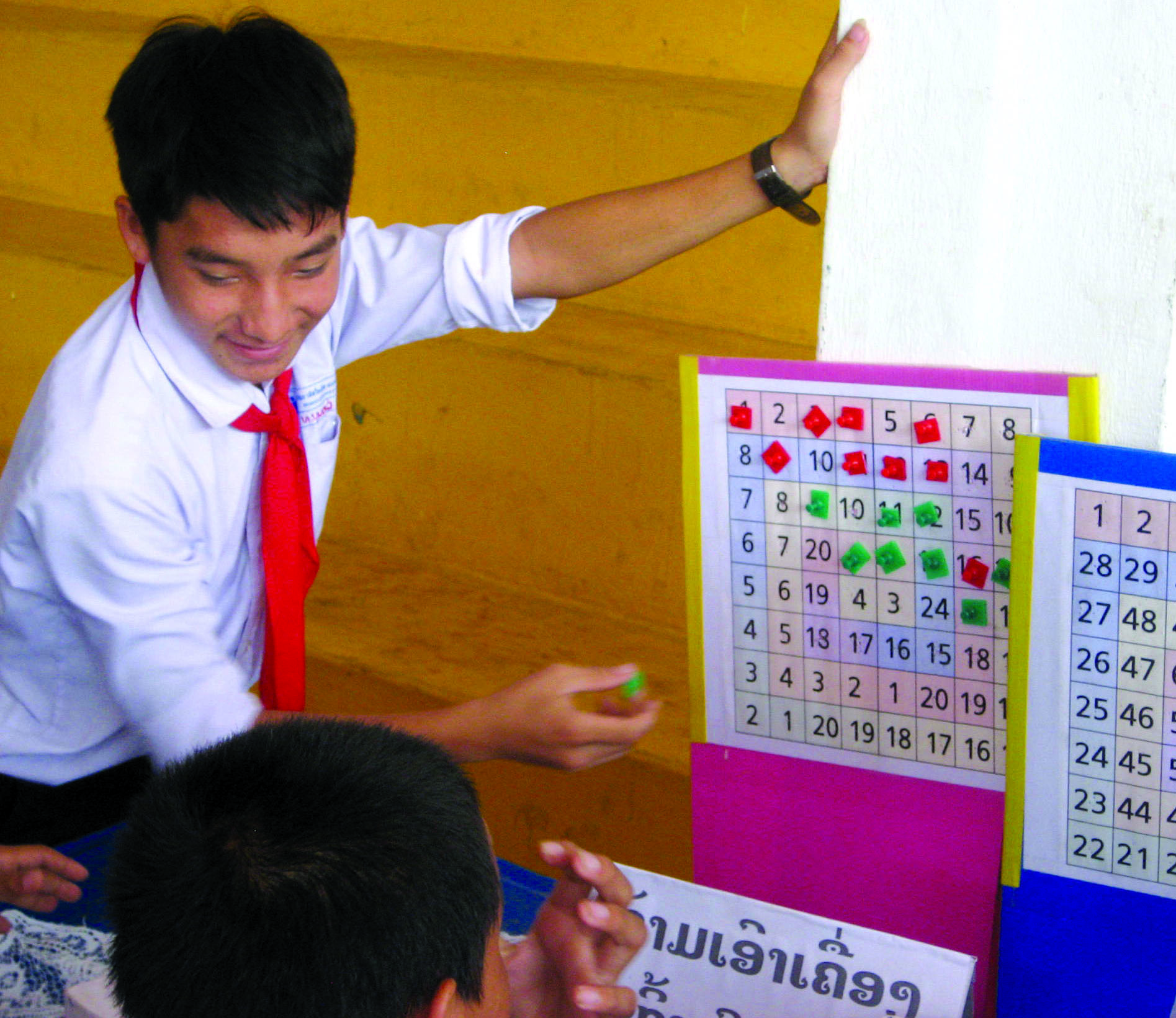
Games can motivate students to improve skills that are usually learned by rote. In "Number Bingo," players roll 3 dice, then perform basic mathematical operations on those numbers to get a new number, which they cover on the board trying to cover 4 squares in a row. This game was played at a "Discovery Day" organized by Big Brother Mouse in Laos.

- Computer-based math: an approach based on the use of mathematical software as the primary tool of computation.
- Computer-based mathematics education: involves the use of computers to teach mathematics. Mobile applications have also been developed to help students learn mathematics.
- Classical education: the teaching of mathematics within the quadrivium, part of the classical education curriculum of the Middle Ages, which was typically based on Euclid's Elements taught as a paradigm of deductive reasoning.
- Conventional approach: the gradual and systematic guiding through the hierarchy of mathematical notions, ideas and techniques. Starts with arithmetic and is followed by Euclidean geometry and elementary algebra taught concurrently. Requires the instructor to be well informed about elementary mathematics since didactic and curriculum decisions are often dictated by the logic of the subject rather than pedagogical considerations. Other methods emerge by emphasizing some aspects of this approach.
- Relational approach: uses class topics to solve everyday problems and relates the topic to current events. This approach focuses on the many uses of mathematics and helps students understand why they need to know it as well as helps them to apply mathematics to real-world situations outside of the classroom.
- Historical method: teaching the development of mathematics within a historical, social, and cultural context. Proponents argue it provides more human interest than the conventional approach.
- Discovery math: a constructivist method of teaching (discovery learning) mathematics which centres around problem-based or inquiry-based learning, with the use of open-ended questions and manipulative tools. This type of mathematics education was implemented in various parts of Canada beginning in 2005. Discovery-based mathematics is at the forefront of the Canadian "math wars" debate with many criticizing it for declining math scores.
- New Math: a method of teaching mathematics which focuses on abstract concepts such as set theory, functions, and bases other than ten. Adopted in the US as a response to the challenge of early Soviet technical superiority in space, it began to be challenged in the late 1960s. One of the most influential critiques of the New Math was Morris Kline's 1973 book Why Johnny Can't Add. The New Math method was the topic of one of Tom Lehrer's most popular parody songs, with his introductory remarks to the song: "...in the new approach, as you know, the important thing is to understand what you're doing, rather than to get the right answer."
- Recreational mathematics: mathematical problems that are fun can motivate students to learn mathematics and can increase their enjoyment of mathematics.
- Standards-based mathematics: a vision for pre-college mathematics education in the United States and Canada, focused on deepening student understanding of mathematical ideas and procedures, and formalized by the National Council of Teachers of Mathematics which created the Principles and Standards for School Mathematics.
- Mastery: an approach in which most students are expected to achieve a high level of competence before progressing.
- Problem solving: the cultivation of mathematical ingenuity, creativity, and heuristic thinking by setting students open-ended, unusual, and sometimes unsolved problems. The problems can range from simple word problems to problems from international mathematics competitions such as the International Mathematical Olympiad. Problem-solving is used as a means to build new mathematical knowledge, typically by building on students' prior understandings.
- Exercises: the reinforcement of mathematical skills by completing large numbers of exercises of a similar type, such as adding simple fractions or solving quadratic equations.
- Rote learning: the teaching of mathematical results, definitions and concepts by repetition and memorisation typically without meaning or supported by mathematical reasoning. A derisory term is drill and kill. In traditional education, rote learning is used to teach multiplication tables, definitions, formulas, and other aspects of mathematics.
- Math walk: a walk where experience of perceived objects and scenes is translated into mathematical language.

== Content and age levels ==
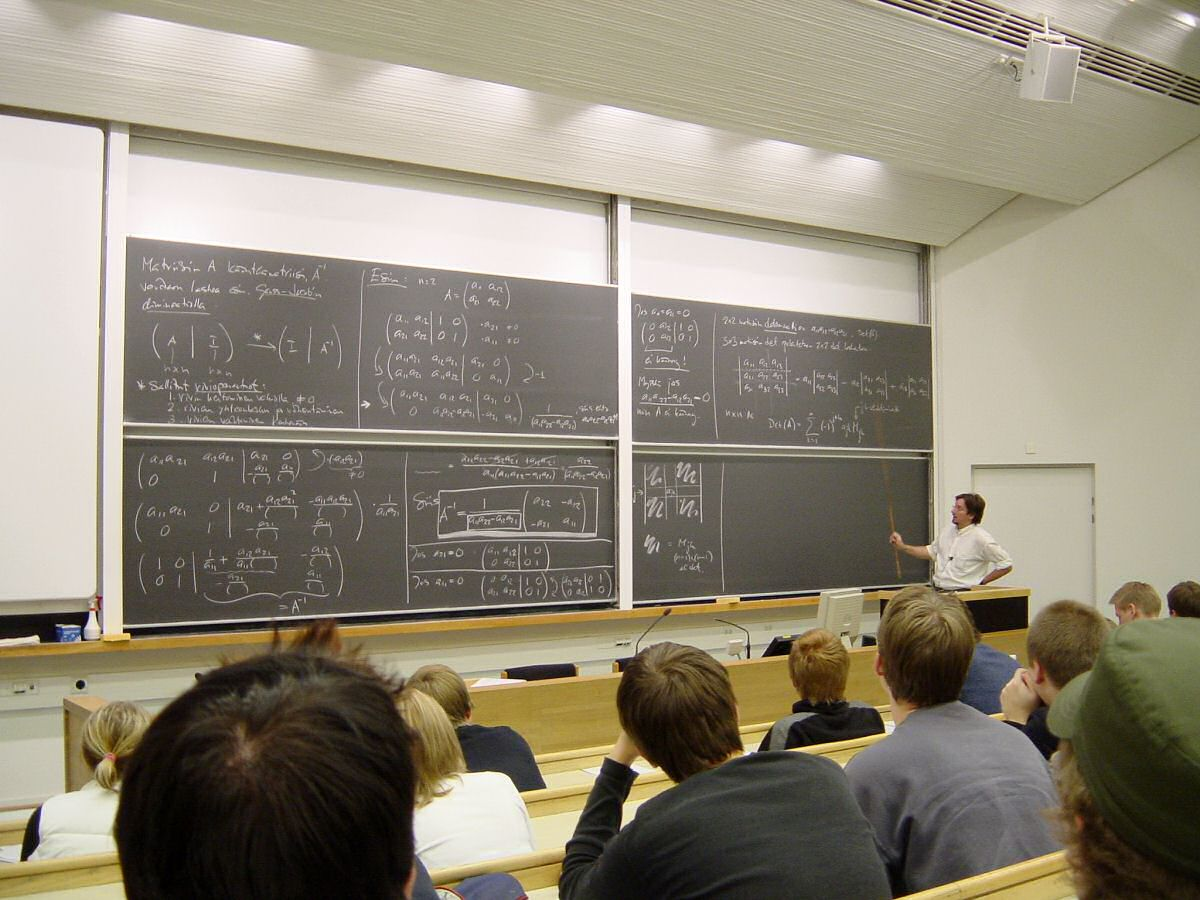
A mathematics lecture at Aalto University School of Science and Technology

Different levels of mathematics are taught at different ages and in somewhat different sequences in different countries. Sometimes a class may be taught at an earlier age than typical as a special or honors class.

Elementary mathematics in most countries is taught similarly, though there are differences. Most countries tend to cover fewer topics in greater depth than in the United States. During the primary school years, children learn about whole numbers and arithmetic, including addition, subtraction, multiplication, and division. Comparisons and measurement are taught, in both numeric and pictorial form, as well as fractions and proportionality, patterns, and various topics related to geometry.

At high school level in most of the US, algebra, geometry, and analysis (pre-calculus and calculus) are taught as separate courses in different years. On the other hand, in most other countries (and in a few US states), mathematics is taught as an integrated subject, with topics from all branches of mathematics studied every year; students thus follow a pre-defined course sequence – encompassing different topics – rather than choosing courses à la carte as in the United States. Even in these cases, however, several "mathematics" options may be offered, selected based on the student's intended studies post high school. (In South Africa, for example, the options are Mathematics, Mathematical Literacy and Technical Mathematics.) Thus, a science-oriented curriculum typically overlaps the first year of university mathematics, and includes differential calculus and trigonometry at age 16–17 and integral calculus, complex numbers, analytic geometry, exponential and logarithmic functions, and infinite series in their final year of secondary school; Probability and statistics are similarly often taught.

At college and university level, science and engineering students will be required to take multivariable calculus, differential equations, and linear algebra; at several US colleges, the minor or AS in mathematics substantively comprises these courses. Mathematics majors study additional areas of pure mathematics—and often applied mathematics—with the requirement of specified advanced courses in analysis and modern algebra. Other topics in pure mathematics include differential geometry, set theory, and topology. Applied mathematics may be taken as a major subject in its own right, covering partial differential equations, optimization, and numerical analysis among other topics. Courses here are also taught within other programs: for example, civil engineers may be required to study fluid mechanics, and "math for computer science" might include graph theory, permutation, probability, and formal mathematical proofs. Pure and applied math degrees often include modules in probability theory or mathematical statistics, as well as stochastic processes. Physics, especially theoretical, is mathematics-intensive, substantively overlapping both pure and applied math.

Coverage in other programs will vary. Business mathematics is usually limited to introductory calculus and (sometimes) matrix calculations; business majors often also take a parallel course in statistics and probability. Additional to these topics, economics programs typically cover optimization, often differential equations and linear algebra, and sometimes analysis; statistics is similarly extended, underpinning econometrics. The discipline of Management Science formalizes the use of mathematics and statistics in business. Social science curricula require statistics also, often complemented by major-specific quantitative research courses. Students in the humanities and liberal arts may be offered a course in "finite math", "contemporary mathematics," "mathematics for the liberal arts," or "quantitative reasoning," which may include topics such as set theory and mathematical logic, and applications of mathematics to other fields. Mathematics courses have low rates of course success relative to other fields of study, and students at US colleges and universities may be required to retake high school mathematics courses through remedial education programs.

== Standards ==
Throughout most of history, standards for mathematics education were set locally, by individual schools or teachers, depending on the levels of achievement that were relevant to, realistic for, and considered socially appropriate for their pupils.

In modern times, there has been a move towards regional or national standards, usually under the umbrella of a wider standard school curriculum. In England, for example, standards for mathematics education are set as part of the National Curriculum for England, while Scotland maintains its own educational system. Many other countries have centralized ministries which set national standards or curricula, and sometimes even textbooks.

Ma (2000) summarized the research of others who found, based on nationwide data, that students with higher scores on standardized mathematics tests had taken more mathematics courses in high school. This led some states to require three years of mathematics instead of two. But because this requirement was often met by taking another lower-level mathematics course, the additional courses had a "diluted" effect in raising achievement levels.

In North America, the National Council of Teachers of Mathematics (NCTM) published the Principles and Standards for School Mathematics in 2000 for the United States and Canada, which boosted the trend towards reform mathematics. In 2006, the NCTM released Curriculum Focal Points, which recommend the most important mathematical topics for each grade level through grade 8. However, these standards were guidelines to implement as American states and Canadian provinces chose. In 2010, the National Governors Association Center for Best Practices and the Council of Chief State School Officers published the Common Core State Standards for US states, which were subsequently adopted by most states. Adoption of the Common Core State Standards in mathematics is at the discretion of each state, and is not mandated by the federal government. "States routinely review their academic standards and may choose to change or add onto the standards to best meet the needs of their students." The NCTM has state affiliates that have different education standards at the state level. For example, Missouri has the Missouri Council of Teachers of Mathematics (MCTM) which has its pillars and standards of education listed on its website. The MCTM also offers membership opportunities to teachers and future teachers so that they can stay up to date on the changes in math educational standards.

The Programme for International Student Assessment (PISA), created by the Organisation for the Economic Co-operation and Development (OECD), is a global program studying the reading, science, and mathematics abilities of 15-year-old students. The first assessment was conducted in the year 2000 with 43 countries participating. PISA has repeated this assessment every three years to provide comparable data, helping to guide global education to better prepare youth for future economies. There have been many ramifications following the results of triennial PISA assessments due to implicit and explicit responses of stakeholders, which have led to education reform and policy change.

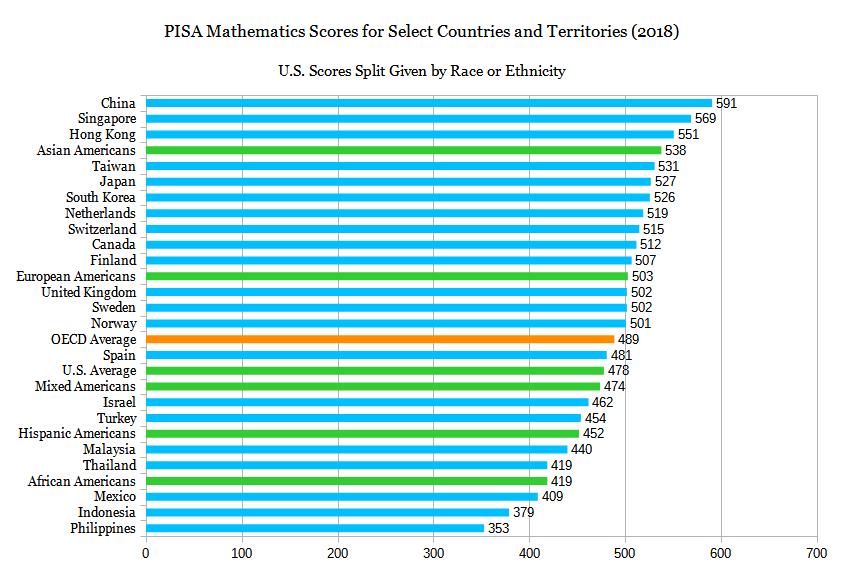

== Research ==
Paul Ernest proposed, in a tentative and incomplete way, some primary and secondary objects of study of research in mathematics education. While the secondary objects come after the primary objects, Ernest claimed that they are "important too, and should not be neglected." These primary objects of study are

- The nature of mathematics and school mathematical knowledge
- The learning of mathematics
- The aims and goals of mathematics teaching and schooling
- The teaching of mathematics, including the methods and approaches involved
- The full range of texts, materials, aids and electronic resources employed
- The human and social contexts of mathematics learning/teaching in all their complexity
- The interaction and relationships between all of the above factors.

The secondary objects of study are

- The nature of mathematics education knowledge: its concepts, theories, results, literature, aims and function
- The nature of mathematics education research: its epistemology, theoretical bases, criteria, methodology, methods, outcomes and goals
- Mathematics education teaching and learning in teacher education, including practice, technique, theory and research
- The social institutions of mathematics education: the persons, locations, institutions (universities, colleges, research centers), conferences, organizations, networks, journals, etc. and their relationships with its overall social or societal contexts.

According to Hiebert and Grouws, "Robust, useful theories of classroom teaching do not yet exist." However, there are useful theories on how children learn mathematics, and much research has been conducted in recent decades to explore how these theories can be applied to teaching. The following results are examples of some of the current findings in the field of mathematics education.

=== Important results ===
One of the strongest results in recent research is that the most important feature of effective teaching is giving students "the opportunity to learn". Teachers can set expectations, times, kinds of tasks, questions, acceptable answers, and types of discussions that will influence students' opportunities to learn. This must involve both skill efficiency and conceptual understanding.

=== Conceptual understanding ===
Two of the most important features of teaching in the promotion of conceptual understanding times are attending explicitly to concepts and allowing students to struggle with important mathematics. Both of these features have been confirmed through a wide variety of studies. Explicit attention to concepts involves making connections between facts, procedures, and ideas. (This is often seen as one of the strong points in mathematics teaching in East Asian countries, where teachers typically devote about half of their time to making connections. At the other extreme is the US, where essentially no connections are made in school classrooms.) These connections can be made through explanation of the meaning of a procedure, questions comparing strategies and solutions of problems, noticing how one problem is a special case of another, reminding students of the main point, discussing how lessons connect, and so on.
Deliberate, productive struggle with mathematical ideas refers to the fact that when students exert effort with important mathematical ideas, even if this struggle initially involves confusion and errors, the result is greater learning. This is true whether the struggle is due to intentionally challenging, well-implemented teaching, or unintentionally confusing, faulty teaching.

=== Formative assessment ===
Formative assessment is both the best and cheapest way to boost student achievement, student engagement, and teacher professional satisfaction. Results surpass those of reducing class size or increasing teachers' content knowledge. Effective assessment is based on clarifying what students should know, creating appropriate activities to obtain the evidence needed, giving good feedback, encouraging students to take control of their learning and letting students be resources for one another.

=== Homework ===
Homework assignments which lead students to practice past lessons or prepare for future lessons are more effective than those going over the current lesson. Students benefit from feedback. Students with learning disabilities or low motivation may profit from rewards. For younger children, homework helps simple skills, but not broader measures of achievement.

=== Students with difficulties ===
Students with genuine difficulties (unrelated to motivation or past instruction) struggle with basic facts, answer impulsively, struggle with mental representations, have poor number sense, and have poor short-term memory. Techniques that have been found productive for helping such students include peer-assisted learning, explicit teaching with visual aids, instruction informed by formative assessment, and encouraging students to think aloud.
In particular, research surrounding students with disabilities in a mathematics classroom is mostly done by special education researchers. Some mathematics education researchers have called for more collaboration across disciplines to better understand supports that could be helpful to mathematics students with disabilities.

=== Algebraic reasoning ===
Elementary school children need to spend a long time learning to express algebraic properties without symbols before learning algebraic notation. When learning symbols, many students believe letters always represent unknowns and struggle with the concept of variable. They prefer arithmetic reasoning to algebraic equations for solving word problems. It takes time to move from arithmetic to algebraic generalizations to describe patterns. Students often have trouble with the minus sign and understand the equals sign to mean "the answer is...".

=== Cultural Equity ===
Despite the popular belief that mathematics is race neutral, some research suggests that effective mathematics teaching of culturally diverse students requires a culturally relevant pedagogy that considers students' cultural backgrounds and experiences. The three criteria for culturally relevant pedagogy are academic success, cultural competence, and critical consciousness. More recent research proposes that culturally sustaining pedagogy explicitly aims to perpetuate and foster cultural and linguistic pluralism within the educational system, ensuring that students can thrive while retaining their cultural identities.

=== Mathematics Teacher Education ===
Student teaching is a crucial part of a teacher candidate's path to becoming a teacher. Recommended reform in mathematics teacher education includes a focus on learning to anticipate, elicit, and use students’ mathematical thinking as the primary goal, as opposed to models with an over-emphasis on classroom management and survival.

=== Methodology ===
As with other educational research (and the social sciences in general), mathematics education research depends on both quantitative and qualitative studies. Quantitative research includes studies that use inferential statistics to answer specific questions, such as whether a certain teaching method gives significantly better results than the status quo. The best quantitative studies involve randomized trials where students or classes are randomly assigned different methods to test their effects. They depend on large samples to obtain statistically significant results.

Qualitative research, such as case studies, action research, discourse analysis, and clinical interviews, depend on small but focused samples in an attempt to understand student learning and to look at how and why a given method gives the results it does. Such studies cannot conclusively establish that one method is better than another, as randomized trials can, but unless it is understood why treatment X is better than treatment Y, application of results of quantitative studies will often lead to "lethal mutations" of the finding in actual classrooms. Exploratory qualitative research is also useful for suggesting new hypotheses, which can eventually be tested by randomized experiments. Both qualitative and quantitative studies, therefore, are considered essential in education—just as in the other social sciences. Many studies are "mixed", simultaneously combining aspects of both quantitative and qualitative research, as appropriate.

==== Randomized trials ====
There has been some controversy over the relative strengths of different types of research. Because of an opinion that randomized trials provide clear, objective evidence on "what works", policymakers often consider only those studies. Some scholars have pushed for more random experiments in which teaching methods are randomly assigned to classes. In other disciplines concerned with human subjects—like biomedicine, psychology, and policy evaluation—controlled, randomized experiments remain the preferred method of evaluating treatments. Educational statisticians and some mathematics educators have been working to increase the use of randomized experiments to evaluate teaching methods. On the other hand, many scholars in educational schools have argued against increasing the number of randomized experiments, often because of philosophical objections, such as the ethical difficulty of randomly assigning students to various treatments when the effects of such treatments are not yet known to be effective, or the difficulty of assuring rigid control of the independent variable in fluid, real school settings.

In the United States, the National Mathematics Advisory Panel (NMAP) published a report in 2008 based on studies, some of which used randomized assignment of treatments to experimental units, such as classrooms or students. The NMAP report's preference for randomized experiments received criticism from some scholars. In 2010, the What Works Clearinghouse (a division of the Institute of Education Sciences, which is the research arm of the Department of Education) responded to ongoing controversy by extending its research base to include non-experimental studies, including regression discontinuity designs and single-case studies.

== History ==
=== Ancient ===
Elementary mathematics was a core part of education in many ancient civilisations, including ancient Egypt, ancient Babylonia, ancient Greece, ancient Rome, and Vedic India. In most cases, formal education was only available to male children with sufficiently high status, wealth, or caste. The oldest known mathematics textbook is the Rhind papyrus, dated from circa 1650 BCE.

==== Pythagorean theorem ====
Historians of Mesopotamia have confirmed that use of the Pythagorean rule dates back to the Old Babylonian Empire (20th–16th centuries BC) and that it was being taught in scribal schools over one thousand years before the birth of Pythagoras.

In Plato's division of the liberal arts into the trivium and the quadrivium, the quadrivium included the mathematical fields of arithmetic and geometry. This structure was continued in the structure of classical education that was developed in medieval Europe. The teaching of geometry was almost universally based on Euclid's Elements. Apprentices to trades such as masons, merchants, and moneylenders could expect to learn such practical mathematics as was relevant to their profession.

=== Medieval and early modern ===
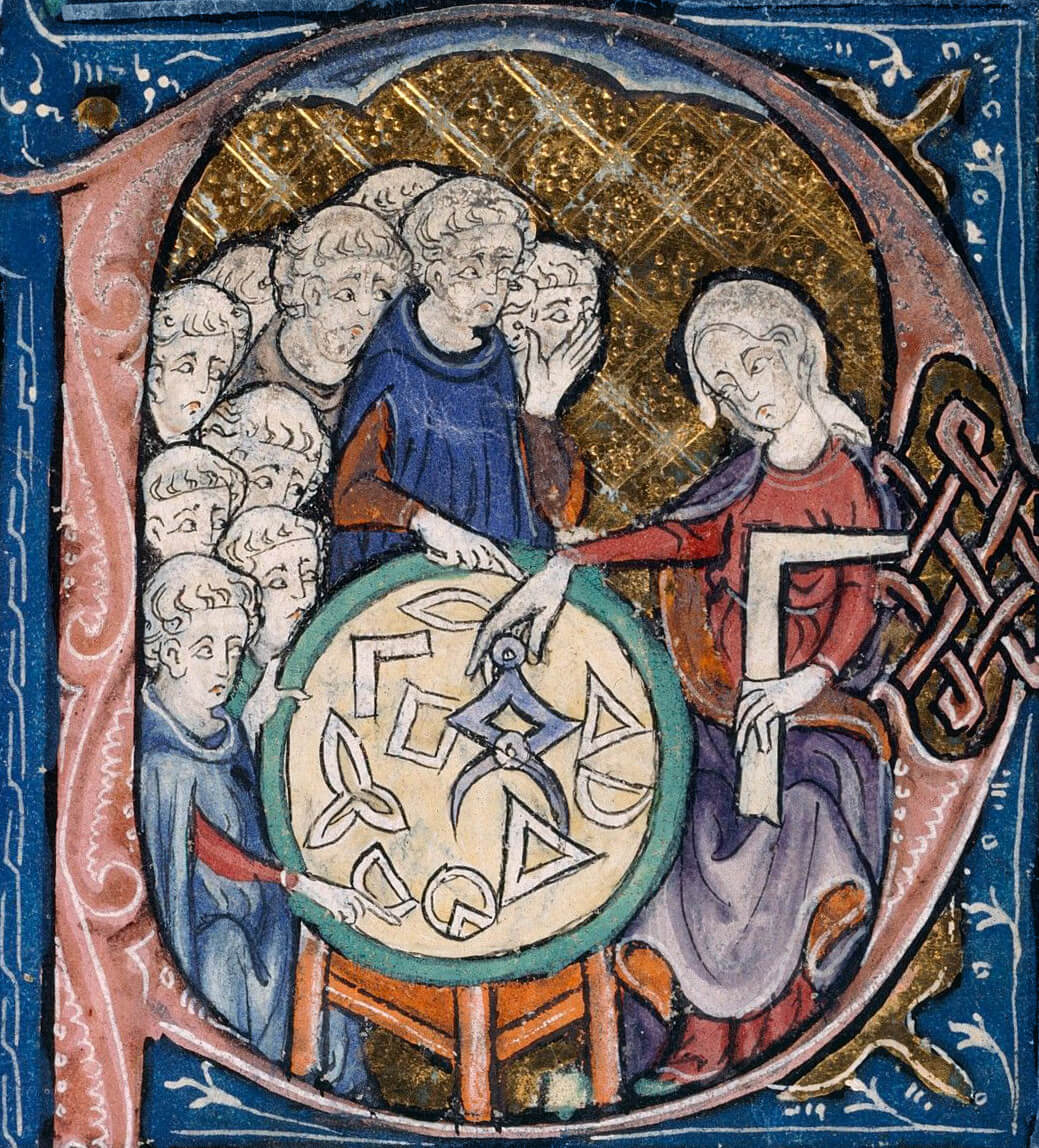
Illustration at the beginning of a 14th-century translation of Euclid's Elements

In the Middle Ages, the academic status of mathematics declined, because it was strongly associated with trade and commerce, and considered somewhat un-Christian. Although it continued to be taught in European universities, it was seen as subservient to the study of natural, metaphysical, and moral philosophy. The first modern arithmetic curriculum (starting with addition, then subtraction, multiplication, and division) arose at reckoning schools in Italy in the 1300s. Spreading along trade routes, these methods were designed to be used in commerce. They contrasted with Platonic math taught at universities, which was more philosophical and concerned numbers as concepts rather than calculating methods. They also contrasted with mathematical methods learned by artisan apprentices, which were specific to the tasks and tools at hand. For example, the division of a board into thirds can be accomplished with a piece of string, instead of measuring the length and using the arithmetic operation of division.

The first mathematics textbooks to be written in English and French were published by Robert Recorde, beginning with The Grounde of Artes in 1543. However, there are many different writings on mathematics and mathematics methodology that date back to 1800 BCE. These were mostly located in Mesopotamia, where the Sumerians were practicing multiplication and division. There are also artifacts demonstrating their methodology for solving equations like the quadratic equation. After the Sumerians, some of the most famous ancient works on mathematics came from Egypt in the form of the Rhind Mathematical Papyrus and the Moscow Mathematical Papyrus. The more famous Rhind Papyrus has been dated back to approximately 1650 BCE, but it is thought to be a copy of an even older scroll. This papyrus was essentially an early textbook for Egyptian students.

The social status of mathematical study was improving by the seventeenth century, with the University of Aberdeen creating a Mathematics Chair in 1613, followed by the Chair in Geometry being set up in University of Oxford in 1619 and the Lucasian Chair of Mathematics being established by the University of Cambridge in 1662.

=== Modern ===
In the 18th and 19th centuries, the Industrial Revolution led to an enormous increase in urban populations. Basic numeracy skills, such as the ability to tell the time, count money, and carry out simple arithmetic, became essential in this new urban lifestyle. Within the new public education systems, mathematics became a central part of the curriculum from an early age.

By the twentieth century, mathematics was part of the core curriculum in all developed countries.

During the twentieth century, mathematics education was established as an independent field of research. Main events in this development include the following:

- In 1893, a Chair in mathematics education was created at the University of Göttingen, under the administration of Felix Klein.
- The International Commission on Mathematical Instruction (ICMI) was founded in 1908, and Felix Klein became the first president of the organisation.
- The professional periodical literature on mathematics education in the United States had generated more than 4,000 articles after 1920, so in 1941 William L. Schaaf published a classified index, sorting them into their various subjects.
- A renewed interest in mathematics education emerged in the 1960s, and the International Commission was revitalized.
- In 1968, the Shell Centre for Mathematical Education was established in Nottingham.
- The first International Congress on Mathematical Education (ICME) was held in Lyon in 1969. The second congress was in Exeter in 1972, and after that, it has been held every four years.

Midway through the twentieth century, the cultural impact of the "electronic age" (McLuhan) was also taken up by educational theory and the teaching of mathematics. While the previous approach focused on "working with specialized 'problems' in arithmetic", the emerging structural approach to knowledge had "small children meditating about number theory and 'sets'." Since the 1980s, there have been a number of efforts to reform the traditional curriculum, which focuses on continuous mathematics and relegates even some basic discrete concepts to advanced study, to better balance coverage of the continuous and discrete sides of the subject:

- In the 1980s and early 1990s, there was a push to make discrete mathematics more available at the post-secondary level;
- From the late 1980s into the new millennium, countries like the US began to identify and standardize sets of discrete mathematics topics for primary and secondary education;
- Concurrently, academics began compiling practical advice on introducing discrete math topics into the classroom;
- Researchers continued arguing the urgency of making the transition throughout the 2000s; and
- In parallel, some textbook authors began working on materials explicitly designed to provide more balance.

Similar efforts are also underway to shift more focus to mathematical modeling as well as its relationship to discrete math.

== Organizations ==
- Advisory Committee on Mathematics Education
- American Mathematical Association of Two-Year Colleges
- Association of Teachers of Mathematics
- Canadian Mathematical Society
- C.D. Howe Institute
- Mathematical Association
- National Council of Teachers of Mathematics
- OECD
- International Association for the Evaluation of Educational Achievement
- Association of Mathematics Teacher Educators

== See also ==
- List of mathematics education journals
- List of mathematics journals

=== Aspects of mathematics education ===
- Cognitively Guided Instruction
- Critical mathematics pedagogy
- Ethnomathematics
- Number sentence, primary level mathematics education
- Pre-math skills
- Sir Cumference, children's mathematics educational book series
- Statistics education

=== North American issues ===
- Chicago movement
- Mathematics education in the United States

=== Mathematical difficulties ===
- Dyscalculia
- Mathematical anxiety
