= CBME =

CBME may refer to:

- CBME-FM, a radio station (88.5 FM) licensed to Montreal, Quebec, Canada
- Computer-based mathematics education
