= Computer-Based Math =

Educational project

Computer-Based Math is an educational project started by Conrad Wolfram in 2010 to promote the idea that routine mathematical calculations should be done with a computer.

Conrad Wolfram believes that mathematics education should make the greatest possible use of computers for performing computation leaving students to concentrate on the application and interpretation of mathematical techniques. Wolfram also argues that computers are the basis of doing math in the real world and that education should reflect that and that programming should be taught as part of math education.

Wolfram contends that this approach is fundamentally different from most of the use of Computers in the classroom (or Computer-based mathematics education), whose role is to help to teach students to perform hand calculations, rather than to perform those computations and is also distinct from delivery tools such as E-learning systems.

In 2010, the website www.computerbasedmath.org was set up to start developing a new curriculum and interactive digital learning materials to support it. It holds an annual conference.

In February 2013, Estonia announced that it would be piloting a Computer-Based Math developed statistics course in cooperation with the University of Tartu. The African Leadership University plans to use materials developed by ComputerBasedMath.org in its Data and Decisions curriculum.

UNICEF supported the third Computer-Based Math Education Summit in New York, in 2013.

Examples of calculations that should be done with a computer include arithmetical operations such as long division or integration techniques such as trigonometric substitution.

In 2020, Wolfram published a book "The Math(s) Fix" detailing the problems and his proposed solution.

== See also ==
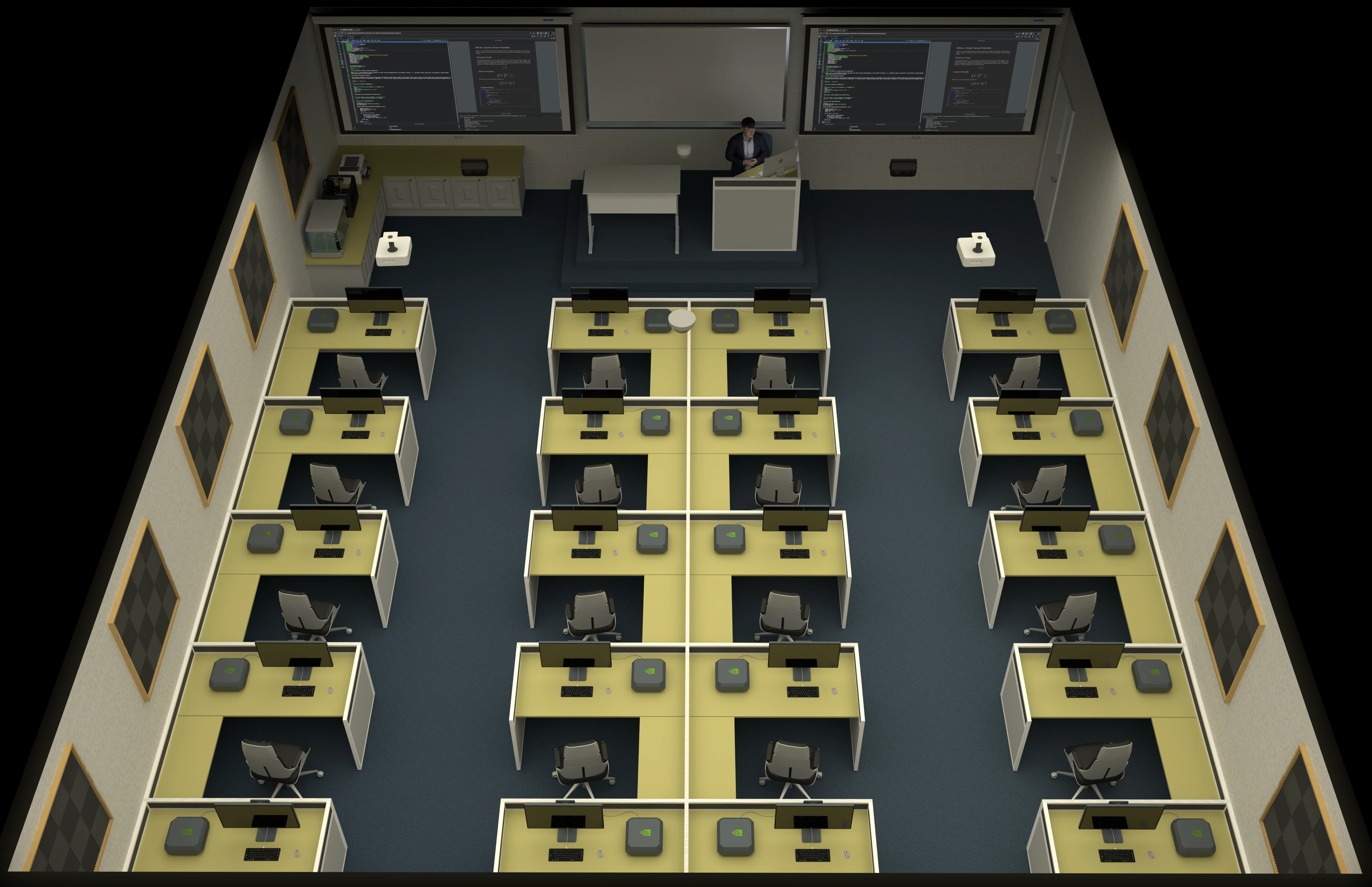
3D sketch of powered carrel cubicals to get computers in the classroom

- Comparison of TeX editors
- Computational thinking
- Mathematical software
- List of open-source software for mathematics
