= Industrial arts =

School subject

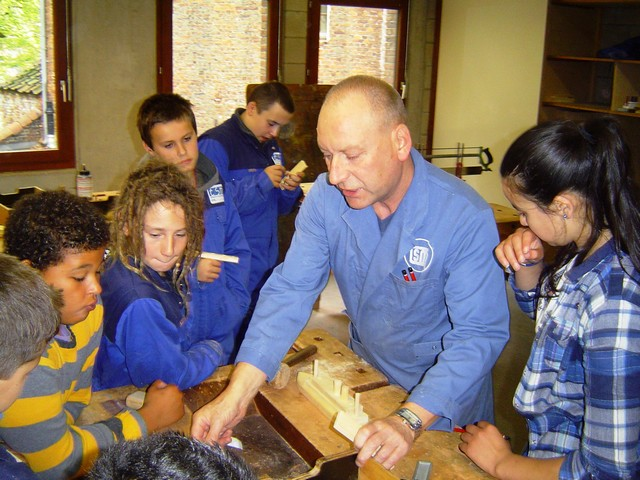
An industrial arts class in the Netherlands

Industrial arts is an educational program that features the fabrication of objects in wood or metal using a variety of hand, power, or machine tools. Industrial arts are commonly referred to as Technology Education. It may include small engine repair and automobile maintenance, and all programs usually cover technical drawing as part of the curricula. As an educational term, industrial arts dates from 1904 when Charles R. Richards of Teachers College, Columbia University, New York suggested it to replace manual training.

In the United States, industrial arts classes are colloquially known as "shop class"; these programs expose students to the basics of home repair, manual craftsmanship, and machine safety. Most industrial arts programs were established in comprehensive rather than dedicated vocational schools and focused on a broad range of skills rather than on a specific vocational training. In 1980, the name of industrial arts education in New York State was changed to "technology education" during what was called the "Futuring Project". The project goal was to increase students' technological literacy.

In Victoria, Australia, industrial arts is still a key part of the high school curriculum. The term now describes a key study of technology that focuses on both engineering and industrial technologies. Additionally, design using the aforementioned technologies is now a key part of the industrial arts curriculum and has been since the mid-1980s.

One of the most important aspects of industrial arts is that students design and create solutions; learning the challenges involved with working with materials and also the challenges of small-scale project management.

Some universities have doctoral programs in industrial arts.

Industrial arts includes product design, industrial design, industrial photography and digital business arts.

== Clubs ==
An industrial arts club is an organization that promotes the use of industrial fabrication equipment by the general public. Clubs have grown out of the decline of industrial arts (a.k.a. shop class) programs in comprehensive school systems in the US.

Clubs began as student organizations in primary and secondary schools offering industrial, the TechShop and Sparqs Industrial Arts Club based in Massachusetts which grew out of campus activities at MIT.

== In New South Wales ==
Industrial Arts (IA) is an important part of the (NSW) high school curriculum. Industrial Arts syllabi are managed, like all NSW syllabi by the Board of Studies. In some schools Industrial Arts faculties have become part of a larger Technology faculty, however, many schools still have a stand-alone Industrial Arts faculty.

The primary role of Industrial Arts education is to expose students to a variety of industrial and engineering technologies that improve their understanding of the industrial and engineered world. Moreover, students learn both project management and design principles, most courses are project-based with students realizing a solution to a design or engineering challenge. Two key components of the projects are synthesis of a solution and evaluation of the final product. Both of these components are the highest order objectives in Bloom's Taxonomy.

=== Curricula ===
Industrial Arts have a single compulsory course for Years 7 and 8: Technology (Mandatory). This course also has areas that cover Home Economics concepts and Information Communication Technologies (ICT) content.

For Years 9 and 10 all Industrial Arts courses are electives, the three electives on offer are Design and Technology, Graphics Technology, and Industrial Technology. The most popular Industrial Arts elective is Industrial Technology.

- Design and Technology: this course centers on design without a prescribed context, so students may work with a variety of non-specified technologies. Students are given a design challenge and they come up with a solution. Their passage through the design process is documented in a Design Folio. In some schools, Design and Technology may not be delivered by the Industrial Arts faculty, in some schools the Home Economics faculty may run the Design and Technology course.
- Graphics Technology: this course introduces students to both manual (pencil) technical drawing and Computer Aided Design (CAD). This course has a core study in Year 9 and then a variety of electives for Year 10 including Engineering Drawing, Architectural Drawing, and Computer Animation.
- Industrial Technology: this course may be studied with a variety of different disciplines with the most popular ones being: timber, metal, electronics, multimedia and engineering. All have a common theme that students are involved in designing and making projects relevant to the context being studied. For example, a student in Industrial Technology – Multimedia may be asked to design an animation or website advertising a product. The development of their project is documented in their Project Report. A key part of the project report is the evaluation of the finished product.

In Years 11 and 12, Industrial Arts offers three Higher School Certificate (HSC) non-Vocational courses: Design and Technology, Engineering Studies, and Industrial Technology.

- Design and Technology is an extension of the junior course of the same name. The course centers on design without a prescribed context, so students may work with a variety of non-specified technologies. For their HSC students must create a Major Design Project. Students establish a need and then try to solve it and realize a solution. A key part of the project is evaluated through the design process. The Major Design project counts for 60% of their final HSC examination mark.
- Engineering Studies is primarily a theory course that introduces students to the engineered world. The course looks at a variety of engineering applications and fields of engineering. Students learn about engineering history and societal implications, engineering mechanics, engineering materials, engineering electronics, and engineering communication methods. The course introduces students to many concepts that they would otherwise the first encounter in undergraduate engineering programs at university. One of the fundamental aspects of the course is learning engineering through the investigation of real-life applications. This builds greater significance and understanding in students.
- Industrial Technology is also an extension of the junior course of the same name. The course centers on students working within a prescribed technology such as Timber Products and Furniture Industries, Multimedia Industries Automotive Industries, Electronics Industries, Graphics Industries, and Metal and Engineering Industries. For their HSC students must create a Major Project. Students develop a project and document their progress through the project. Hence they learn the vital skills of project management. Similar to Design and Technology evaluation of the project is an important part of the associated documentation. The Major Project counts for 60% of their final HSC examination mark. The fundamental difference between Industrial Technology and Design and Technology is that a student studying Industrial Technology must study theory relevant to specific technology and also study industry practices relevant to their technology.

=== Professional association ===
In NSW the professional association for Industrial Arts teachers is the Institute of Industrial Arts Technology Education (IIATE). This organization releases a quarterly journal (on CD) and also runs an annual conference that investigates matters relevant to Industrial Arts education. Moreover, the IIATE represents Industrial Arts teachers in a variety of situations such as syllabus development meetings and teacher training interviews.

The IIATE has successfully run training programs for CAD software which has enabled many more teachers to effectively embed CAD into their teaching.

== See also ==
- Applied arts
- Career and technical education
- Design and Technology, the equivalent course in the United Kingdom and many Commonwealth countries
- Industrial design
