= Elizabeth Fennema =

American educator (1928–2021)

Ann Elizabeth Fennema (née Hammer; April 8, 1928 – December 20, 2021) was an American educator specializing in the teaching of mathematics.

== Early life and education ==
Fennema was born in El Dorado, Kansas, on April 8, 1928, and attended the local Methodist college for two years, before transferring to Kansas State University where she majored in psychology. She received her master's degree in education from the University of Wisconsin in 1952.

In 1962 Kathryn Clarenbach (a founder of NOW) sent out a questionnaire inquiring of unemployed or underemployed wives of university professors who were interested in a career. As a result of this process Fennema was asked to be a supervisor of student teachers. In this position she worked for Vere DeVault who encouraged her to pursue a doctorate in education and served as her dissertation adviser. She began in 1962 and received the degree in 1969 in curriculum and instruction in mathematics education. In 1962 "new math" was in vogue and many educators were thinking deeply about how to teach mathematical understanding to students. Fennema recognized the importance of a good foundation in mathematics was critical for all students leading to her interest in math education.

== Career ==
After finishing her PhD she was hired as a half time, non-tenured track, position. In 1970 the University created part-time tenured-track positions and Fennema obtained one of the positions.

Fennema and Julia Sherman applied for a grant from the National Science Foundation (NSF) research grant to examine factors in mathematics classroom that might be associated with gender, resulting in the "Fennema-Sherman studies". Fennema and her associates have spent over 25 years researching interactions of girls and young women in mathematics classrooms. One outgrowth of this was a questionnaire, the "Fennema-Sherman Scales" to enable researchers to gather data on the attitudes of young women towards mathematics, and the results from different sites compared. She and her colleagues have also developed an innovative method of teaching mathematics called Cognitively Guided Instruction. The Cognitively Guided Instruction (CGI) philosophy is detailed in Children's Mathematics which she co-authored with Thomas Carpenter, Megan Loef Franke, Linda Levi, and Susan Empson.

She retired from the University of Wisconsin at the end of the 1995–1996 academic year.

== Awards ==
Fennema received the first Annual Award for Outstanding Contribution to Research on Women and Education from the American Educational Research Association (Special Interest Group for Research on Women in Education) in 1985. She received the Dora Helen Skypek Award from the Association for Women and Mathematics Education in 1986.

She received a Doctor of Humane Letters degree from Mount Mary College in 1994. She received the 2021 National Council of Teachers of Mathematics (NCTM) Lifetime Achievement Award.

== Personal life and death ==
Fennema married Owen Fennema in 1948. She died on December 20, 2021.

== Sources ==
- Notable Women in Mathematics, a Biographical Dictionary, edited by Charlene Morrow and Teri Perl, Greenwood Press, 1998. pp 51–56
