= Institute of Industrial Arts Technology Education =

The Institute of Industrial Arts Technology Education is the professional association for New South Wales (NSW) Industrial Arts educators.
