= Cognitively Guided Instruction =

Approach to mathematical education

Cognitively Guided Instruction is "a professional development program based on an integrated program of research on (a) the development of students' mathematical thinking; (b) instruction that influences that development; (c) teachers' knowledge and beliefs that influence their instructional practice; and (d) the way that teachers' knowledge, beliefs, and practices are influenced by their understanding of students' mathematical thinking". CGI is an approach to teaching mathematics rather than a curriculum program. At the core of this approach is the practice of listening to children's mathematical thinking and using it as a basis for instruction. Research based frameworks of children's thinking in the domains of addition and subtraction, multiplication and division, base-ten concepts, multidigit operations, algebra, geometry and fractions provide guidance to teachers about listening to their students. Case studies of teachers using CGI have shown the most accomplished teachers use a variety of practices to extend children's mathematical thinking. It's a tenet of CGI that there is no one way to implement the approach and that teachers' professional judgment is central to making decisions about how to use information about children's thinking.

The research base on children' mathematical thinking upon which CGI is based shows that children are able to solve problems without direct instruction by drawing upon informal knowledge of everyday situations. For example, a study of kindergarten children showed that young children can solve problems involving what are normally considered advanced mathematics such as multiplication, division, and multistep problems, by using direct modeling. Direct modeling is an approach to problem solving in which the child, in the absence of more sophisticated knowledge of mathematics, constructs a solution to a story problem by modeling the action or structure. For example, about half of the children in a study of kindergartners' problem solving were able to solve this multistep problem, which they had never seen before, using direct modeling: 19 children are taking a mini-bus to the zoo. They will have to sit either 2 or 3 to a seat. The bus has 7 seats. How many children will have to sit three to a seat, and how many can sit two to a seat?

Example: Fred had six marbles at school. On the way home from school his friend Joey gave him some more marbles. Now Fred has eleven marbles. How many marbles did Joey give to Fred?

Students may solve this problem by counting down from eleven or by counting up from six. With the use of manipulatives students would be able to represent their thoughts for this problem multiple ways. For instance, they might make a row of six counting blocks next to a row of eleven counting blocks and then compare the difference.

The CGI philosophy is detailed in Children's Mathematics which is co-authored by Thomas Carpenter, Elizabeth Fennema, Megan Loef Franke, Linda Levi, and Susan Empson.
