= Zearn =

American educational software company

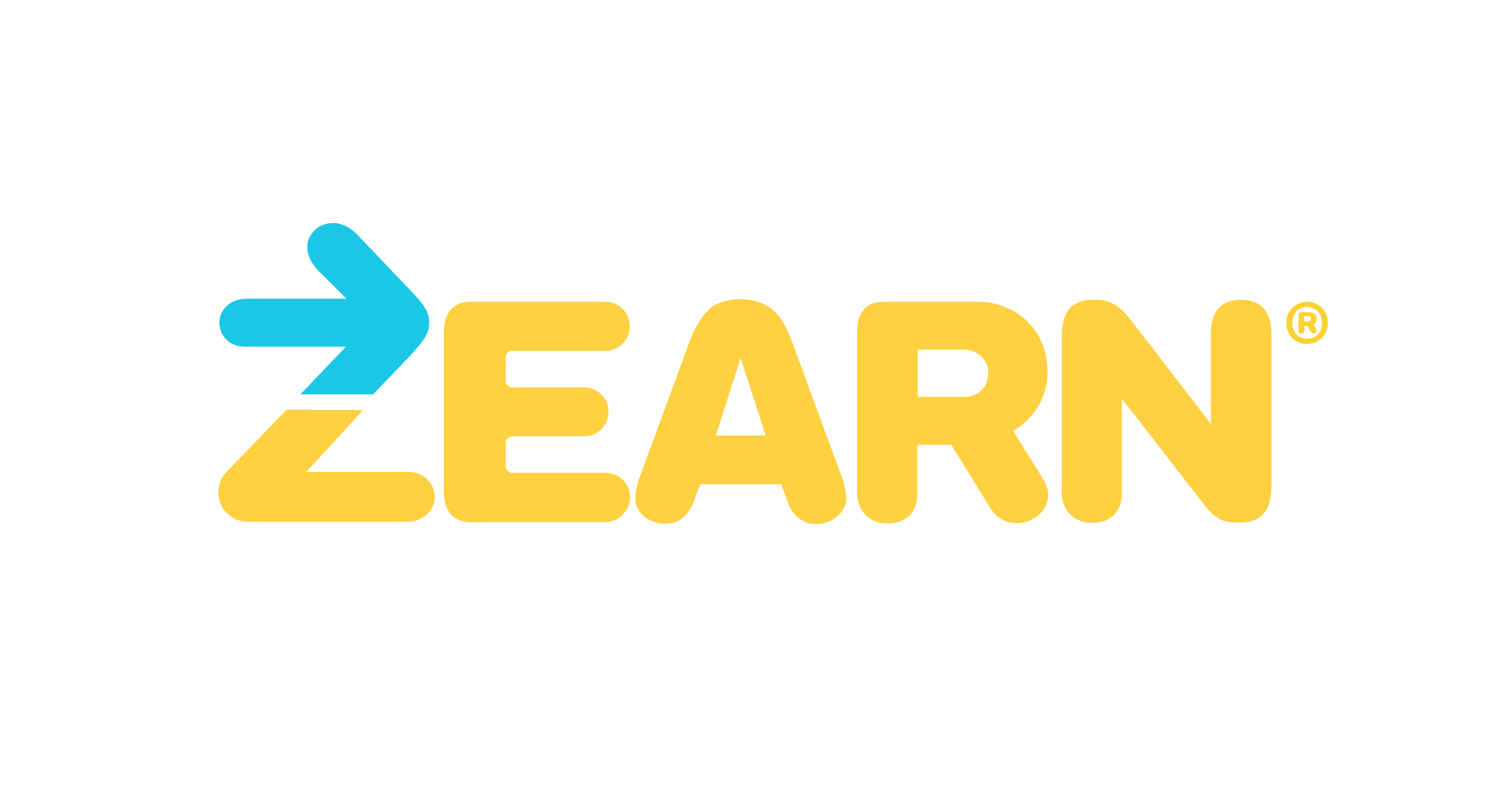
- Zearn Corporate logo
- Type: 501(c)(3)
- Industry: Educational technology
- Founded: 2012; 14 years ago
- Founders: Shalinee Sharma (CEO); Evan Rudall
- Headquarters: New York City, New York, U.S.
- Services: Online learning platform
- Website: zearn.org

Zearn is an American nonprofit educational software organization founded in 2012. It develops the Zearn Math curriculum, which includes a combination of live instruction, printed materials and digital components.

== Overview ==
Its curriculum includes a combination of digital and printed materials, which are designed to be administered by teachers and educators as part of live classroom instruction, tutoring sessions, or intervention periods. Its digital content includes fluency games, videos, and quizzes, many of which handle topics like conceptual understanding and procedural fluency. The physical and print components of its curriculum include student workbooks, course guides, instructional materials, and math manipulatives. The platform's digital content is accessed via web browser.

== History ==
Zearn was co-founded in 2012 by CEO Shalinee Sharma and Evan Rudall, former CEO of Uncommon Schools. It received $4.4 million in funding from the Bill & Melinda Gates Foundation, part of the foundation's $1 billion investment into math education.

In 2015, the company became a signatory of the voluntary Student Privacy Pledge and added encryption to its security features, which are intended to prevent "protect the loss, misuse or alteration" of student information. The platform is certified as compliant with SOC 2 data security and confidentiality criteria.

In 2017, the company launched a curriculum for K–5 students, which was followed by a K–8 curriculum in 2022. Much of its content handles topics like adaptive mathematics skills, conceptual understanding, and procedural fluency.

In 2025, the platform received a "strong" rating from Evidence for ESSA, which found that Zearn Math had an average effect size of +0.09 on student outcomes based on 3 studies. This included a large-scale randomized controlled trial conducted by RAND Corporation, which found statistically significant gains on the NWEA MAP assessment.

== Usage ==
As of 2022, the company claimed that its software was used by 25% of US elementary school students and more than one million middle school students. In addition to mainstream classroom use, the platform is also used in personalized tutoring and small group instruction. The platform is used by public, private, charter and religious schools, and is also used in homeschooling. As of February 2025, over 60% of the platform's partners were Title I schools.

The platform is used by accelerated education programs in numerous states, including Colorado, Delaware, the District of Columbia, Louisiana, Massachusetts, Nebraska, New York, Ohio, South Carolina, Tennessee, Texas, and Virginia.

The platform was approved by the Texas State Board of Education during its 2024–2025 Instructional Materials Review and Approval cycle.
