= Computer-based mathematics education =

Approach to teaching mathematics that emphasizes the use of computers

Computer-based mathematics education (CBME) is an approach to teaching mathematics that emphasizes the use of computers and mathematical software.

== Computers in math education ==
Computers are used in education in a number of ways, such as interactive tutorials, hypermedia, simulations and educational games. Tutorials are types of software that present information, check learning by question/answer method, judge responses, and provide feedback. Educational games are more like simulations and are used from the elementary to college level. E learning systems can deliver math lessons and exercises and manage homework assignments.

== Computer-based mathematics ==
- Computer algebra - computer algebra systems, list of computer algebra systems, free computer algebra software.
- Computational geometry - list of interactive geometry software, list of information graphics software, free plotting software.
- Computational statistics - list of statistical software, comparison of statistical packages, data mining software, analytics.
- Data science - list of numerical-analysis software, machine learning software, list of open-source data science software.
- Computational science - computational physics, chemistry, biomathematics, economics, list of computer simulation software.
- Mathematical programming - linear, nonlinear, integer, linear algebra libraries, list of numerical libraries and languages.
- Engineering mathematics - computational engineering, Mathcad, list of computer-aided engineering software.
- Mathematical notation software - Comparison of TeX editors, TeX, LaTeX, KaTeX, AsciiMath, GNU TeXmacs, MathJax, MathML.
- Algorithms - list of algorithms, algorithm design, analysis of algorithms, algorithm engineering, list of data structures.
- Cryptography - cryptography algorithms, comparison of cryptography libraries.
- Mathematical art - mathematical visualizations, fractal art, parametric surfaces, algorithmic art, platonic solids, simulations, procedural generation, ray tracing, List of mathematical art software.

== See also ==
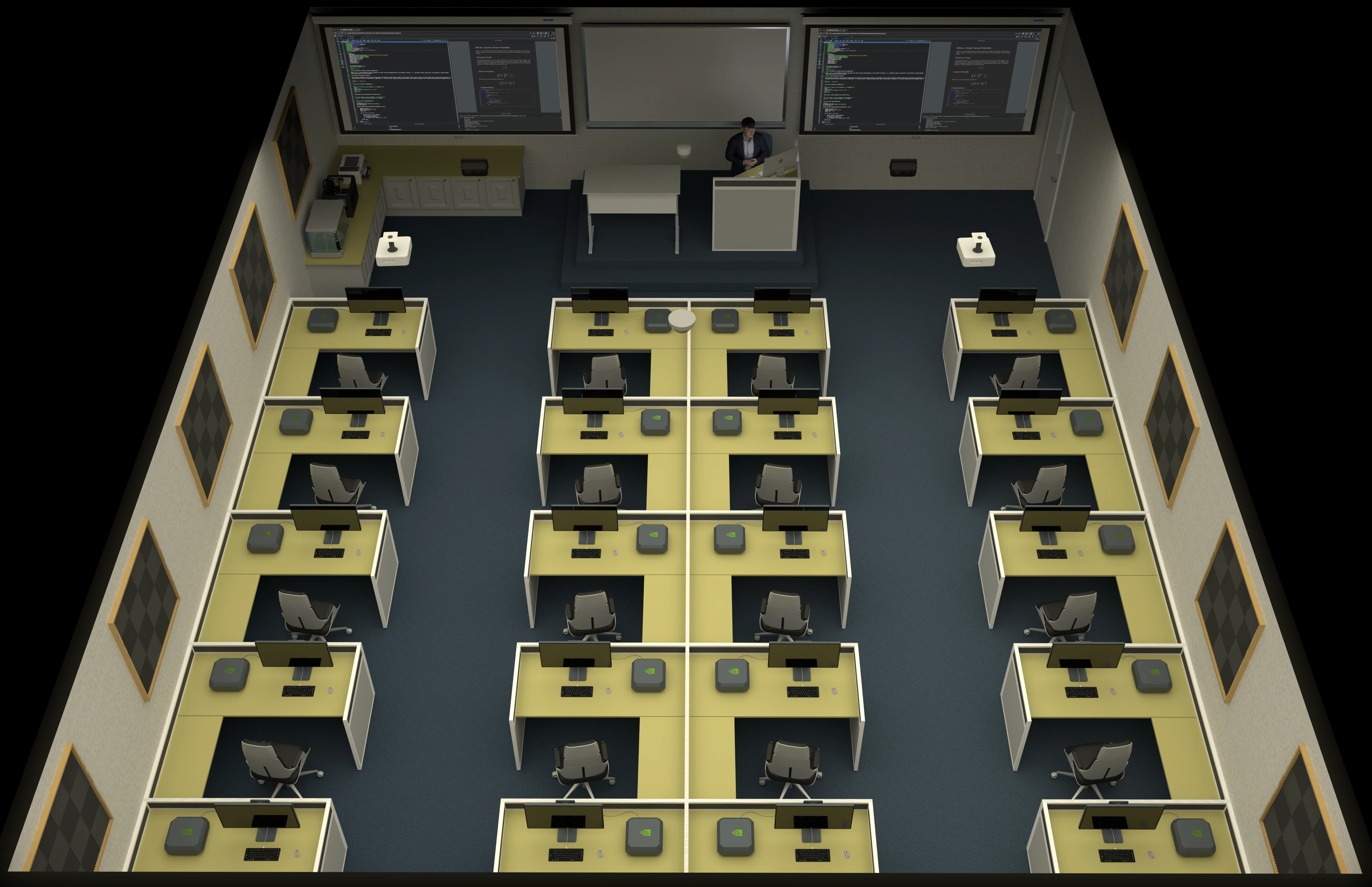
3D sketch of powered carrel cubicles to get computers on the desk in the classroom for computer-based math, CAD, CAM, BIM, computer-aided engineering, computer programming, animation software, science software applications, and more.

- ALEKS – a computer-based education system that includes mathematics among its curricula
- Computer-Based Math – a project aimed at using computers for computational tasks and spending more classroom time on applications
- Mathletics (educational software), a popular K-12 mathematics learning program from 3P Learning
- Mathspace – a similar program for students aged 7-18, founded in Australia in 2010
- Sokikom – a team-based math learning game
- Mathlete
- MathOverflow
- Datathons
- List of MATLAB software and tools
- The Math(s) Fix - 2020 book by Conrad Wolfram on computational mathematics education
- Zearn - online K-8 digital math curriculum widely used in elementary and middle schools in the United States
- DreamBox Learning - online K-8 digital math curriculum
