= Mathspace =

Online mathematics education program

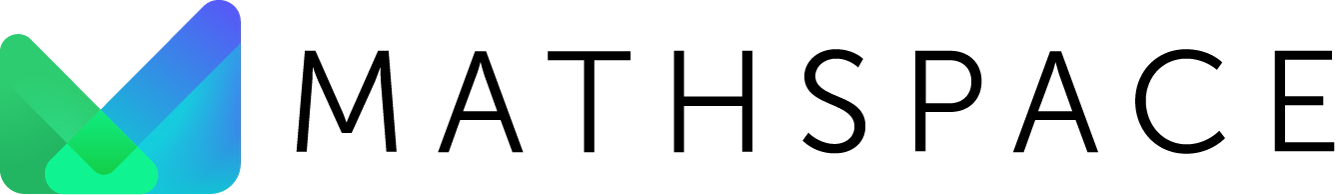
- Genre: Computer-based mathematics education
- Founded: 2010
- Founders: Mohamad Jebara, Chris Velis, Alvin Savoy
- Headquarters: Sydney, Australia
- Key people: Daniel Tu-Hoa
- Website: www.mathspace.co

Mathspace is an online mathematics program designed for students in primary/elementary, secondary, and higher education. It is designed for students aged between 7 and 18 and is used by schools in Australia, New Zealand, the United States, Canada, the United Kingdom, Hong Kong and India. Mathspace includes Grade 3 to Algebra 2 level mathematics (in the United States). It also offers an artificial intelligence math tutor.

Mathspace uses an adaptive learning model to personalize the software experience for each student. The questions presented to a user are chosen by an algorithm that responds to past performance, and student input is evaluated to provide feedback on their progress within each problem. Additional support is offered in the form of hints and video tutorials to guide them to the solution. The software assesses each student's performance and generates accompanying report statistics.

== Partnerships ==
Mathspace partnered with Eddie Woo in 2017. Together they created a video hub to categorize Woo's education videos in the various state curricula across Australia.

== Awards ==
Year	Award(s)
2017	Westpac Businesses of Tomorrow (winner); ASU GSV Venture Award (winner)
2015	Bett Awards, Innovation in ICT (finalist); SIIA Education Technology Innovation Network, Most Likely to Succeed (winner); SIIA Education Technology Innovation Network, Most Innovative (runner up); ISTE Ed Tech Start-Up Pitch Fest, Most Innovative (winner); ISTE Ed Tech Start-Up Pitch Fest, Most Likely to Succeed (winner); Association of American Publishers, Golden Lamp Award (best whole of curriculum product, all subject areas – winner)
2014	Bett Awards, Secondary Digital Content (winner); Bett Awards, Educational Apps (finalist); CeBIT Start-Up Pitchfest (winner)
2013	Advance Innovation Summit, Best Company (winner); Echelon Ignite Australia, Most Promising Startup (winner)

== 2026 data breach ==
Due to an uninstalled security patch, over one million users including students, staff, and parents were affected between the 10th and 27th of August. Mathspace confirmed this attack on the 3rd of September, stating that a total of 1,079,819 people were affected in Australia and New Zealand.
