= Sokikom =

Education game program

- Company type: Private
- Website type: Education Technology
- Available in: English, Spanish
- Founded: 2008
- Headquarters: San Jose, California
- Creator: Snehal Patel
- Website: sokikom.com
- Registration: Required
- Current status: Active

Sokikom (so-kee-kom) is a digital elementary education program that aims to teach math through cooperative games, founded in San Jose, California, in 2008 by Snehal Patel.

== Math learning games ==
Sokikom's online math games are rooted in the nationally recognized standards of the National Council of Teachers of Mathematics Curriculum Focal Points for Grades PreK-8 and align with the Common Core Standards for grades k-5. Sokikom is designed as an adaptive learning experience.

== Awards and reviews ==
Sokikom received a 2011 BESSIE Award from ComputED Gazette, recognizing Sokikom's multiplayer math games in the category Best for Early Elementary Students. It was further recognized in the category Best Gaming & Adaptive Learning Company at the 2011 Education Innovation Summit at SkySong, the Arizona State University Scottsdale Innovation Center, and in 2011, received a Success Award from the Arizona Small Business Development Center Network (AZSBDC) for its contribution to the Arizona economy. The Association of Educational Publishers presented Sokikom with a Distinguished Achievement Award in the category of Mathematics Curriculum.

== Funding ==
The company was initially funded by grants from the Institute of Education Sciences, the main research arm of the United States Department of Education.
