= Computers in the classroom =

Use of computers in school

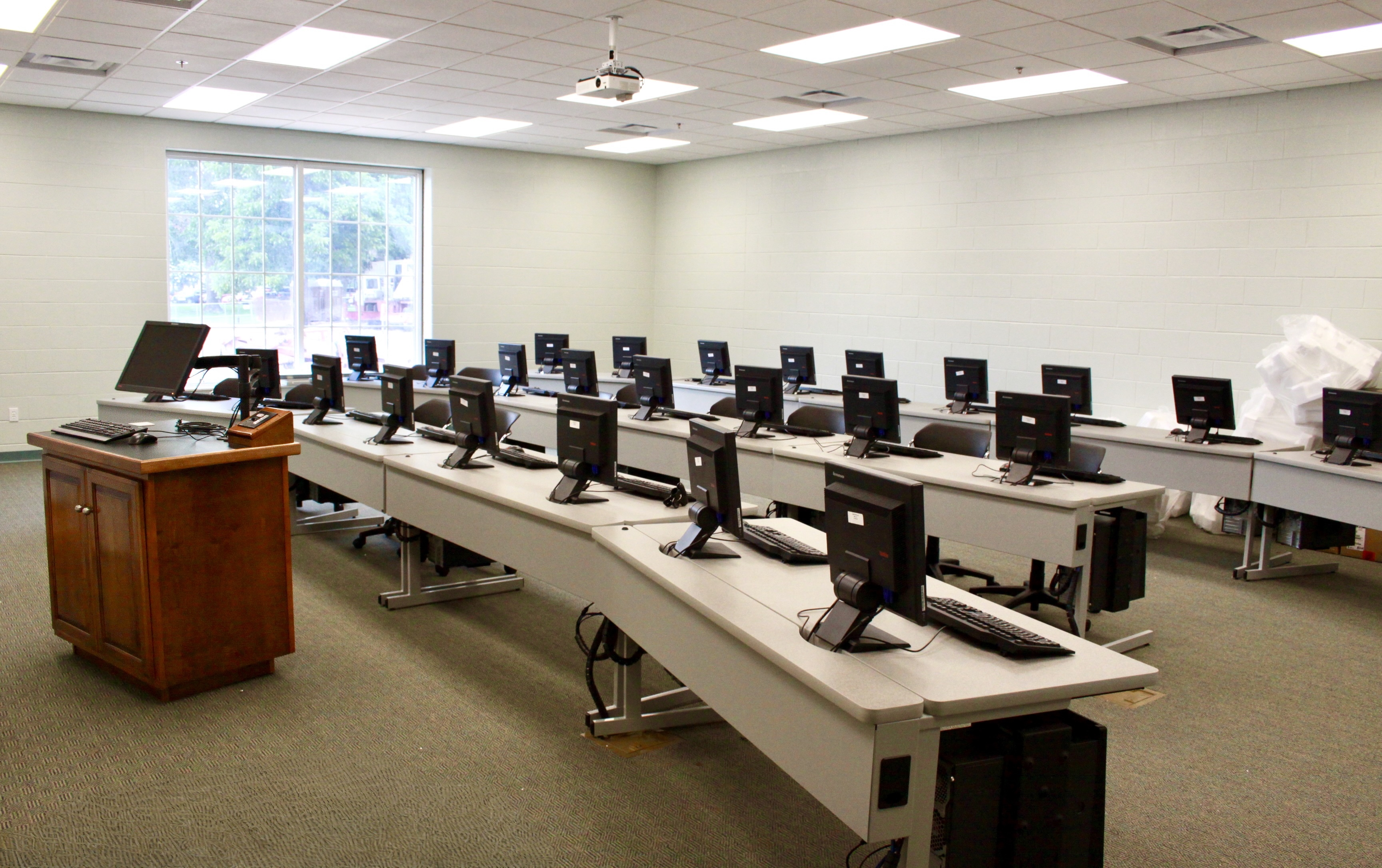
A computer science classroom at a University in 2009

Computers in the classroom include any digital technology used to enhance, supplement, or replace a traditional educational curriculum with computer science education. As computers have become more accessible, inexpensive, and powerful, the demand for this technology has increased, leading to more frequent use of computer resources within classes, and a decrease in the student-to-computer ratio within schools.

== Computer education history ==
=== Origins ===
College campuses used computer mainframes in education since the initial days of this technology, and throughout the initial development of computers. The earliest large-scale study of educational computer usage conducted for the National Science Foundation by The American Institute for Research concluded that 13% of the nation's public high schools used computers for instruction, although no-users still outnumbered users at a ratio of 2 to 1. The study also concluded that computers proved to be very popular with students, and that applications run on early models included sports statistic managers, administration tools, and physics simulators.

In 1975, Apple Inc. began donating Apple 1 model computers to schools, and mainframes began to lose their former dominance over academic research. Computer usage continued to grow rapidly throughout this era. In 1977, it was estimated that over 90% of students at Dartmouth College had used computers at some point in their college careers. Walter Koetke, the director of a Lexington, Massachusetts school system commented that, "It's still possible for a student to get through here without using the computer, but he would certainly have to try to do it". In 1983, Drexel University became the first campus to require every student to purchase a laptop.

Computer-aided instruction gained widespread acceptance in schools by the early 1980s. It was during this period that drilling and practice programs were first developed for exclusive classroom use. Schools became divided over which computer manufacturers they were willing to support, with some using Apple II computers and others IBM PC compatibles. Hardware shortages became a major issue, leaving many teachers unable to provide enough computers for students to use. Despite this, by 1989 computer usage shifted from being a relative rarity in American public schools, to being part of most school districts.

=== Modern Era ===
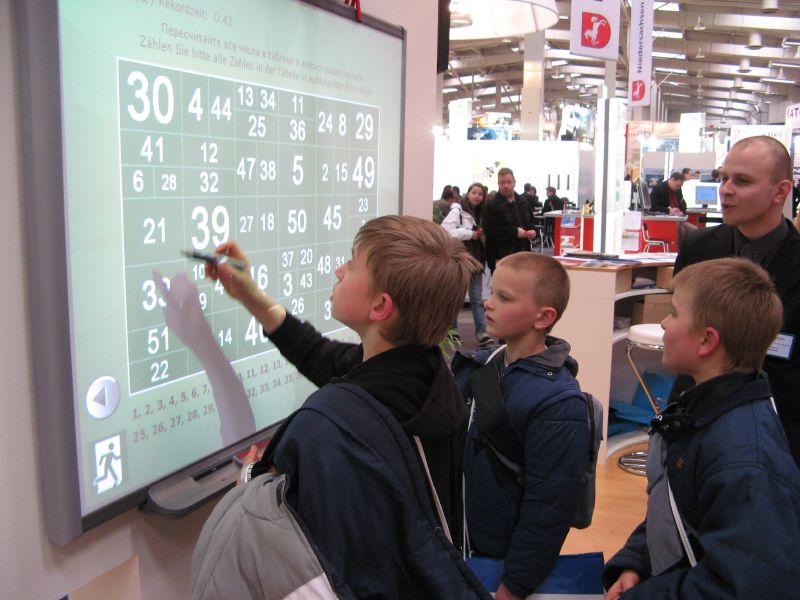
The interactive whiteboard is an example of computers replacing traditional classroom technology.

The early 1990s marked the beginning of modern media technology such as CD-ROMs as well as the development of modern presentation software such as Microsoft PowerPoint. Other computer-based technology including the electronic whiteboard and the laptop computer became widely available to students. Internet technologies were also gaining prevalence in schools. In 1996, Bill Clinton made over $2 billion in grants available in the Technology Literacy Challenge Fund, a program which challenged schools to make computers and the Internet available to every student, connected to the outside world, and engaging. This marked a significant increase in the demand for computer technology in many public school systems throughout the globe.

Correlating with the development of modern operating systems like Windows 98 and the continuing support of government funding, the prevalence of educational computer usage boomed during this era. Between 1997 and 1999, the ratio of students to multimedia computers decreased from 21 students per machine to less than 10 students per machine. Colleges began creating specialized classrooms designed to provide students with access to the utilization of the most modern technology available. Classrooms such as the "Classroom 2000" built at Georgia Tech in 1999 which featured computers with audio and video equipment designed to capture detailed recordings of lectures as a replacement for traditional note taking began to become more common. By 2000, the student to computer ratio at some schools in the US decreased to only 1 students per school computer.

As collaborative classroom environments became mainstream, more schools as a whole began to invest in powerful networks and faster Internet connections. By 2010, many school districts implemented or encouraged "1:1 learning programs" which would ensure that all students in grade school would be provided with a personal laptop. Computers have significantly changed traditional teaching methodology into a more "hands-on" approach, with Forbes predicting that, "Instead of parking themselves in a lecture hall for hours, students will work in collaborative spaces, where future doctors, lawyers, business leaders, engineers, journalists and artists learn to integrate their different approaches to problem solving and innovate together."

Experience has shown, however, that excessive use of computers can be detrimental to a student's basic academic skills. The Organisation for Economic Co-operation and Development has compared average student literacy, numeracy and science skills in 31 countries (considering three large cities in China separately). It also compared the levels of student computer use in those same countries. The study's conclusion, after correcting for social backgrounds and student demographics, was that moderate use of classroom computers produces the best educational outcomes.

== 21st century ==
=== Demands ===
The shift in worldwide computer usage and the need for computer skills in today's workforce have pushed the United States government to create guidelines for educators to ensure that students are prepared to meet the demands of the 21st century. The Core Curriculum Content Standards for education are aimed at preparing students with such skills demanded of those entering the 21st century learning environment as well as the 21st century and work environment.

Changes such as this, along with the changes in the ways that 21st century learners communicate, have impacted the ways that classroom computers are utilized. Currently, teachers are tapping into the enhanced abilities of current classroom computer technology by utilizing various Web 2.0 tools to enhance their instruction. Such tools are also being used to extend classroom communication outside of the campus through online collaborative tools. Centered primarily on collaboration and sharing, Web 2.0 computer applications encourage student self-expression; interaction with peers, and opportunity for authentic learning experiences Through the implementation and integration of Web 2.0 computer technologies into the classroom setting, authentic and meaningful learning experiences are now able to occur in ways that have been previously unimaginable. Currently, the learning that is taking place is not simply about typical concepts or facts as laid out in school curricula. Instead, it is about the process of building connections As a result, the awareness of the importance and the value of communication is becoming instilled into children. Today, with a single laptop, Webcam, projector, and an Internet connection, a teacher can broadcast and begin collaboration with any other classroom. As groups of learners coalesce around shared passions online, they experience something that is difficult to replicate in physical space.

=== Applications ===
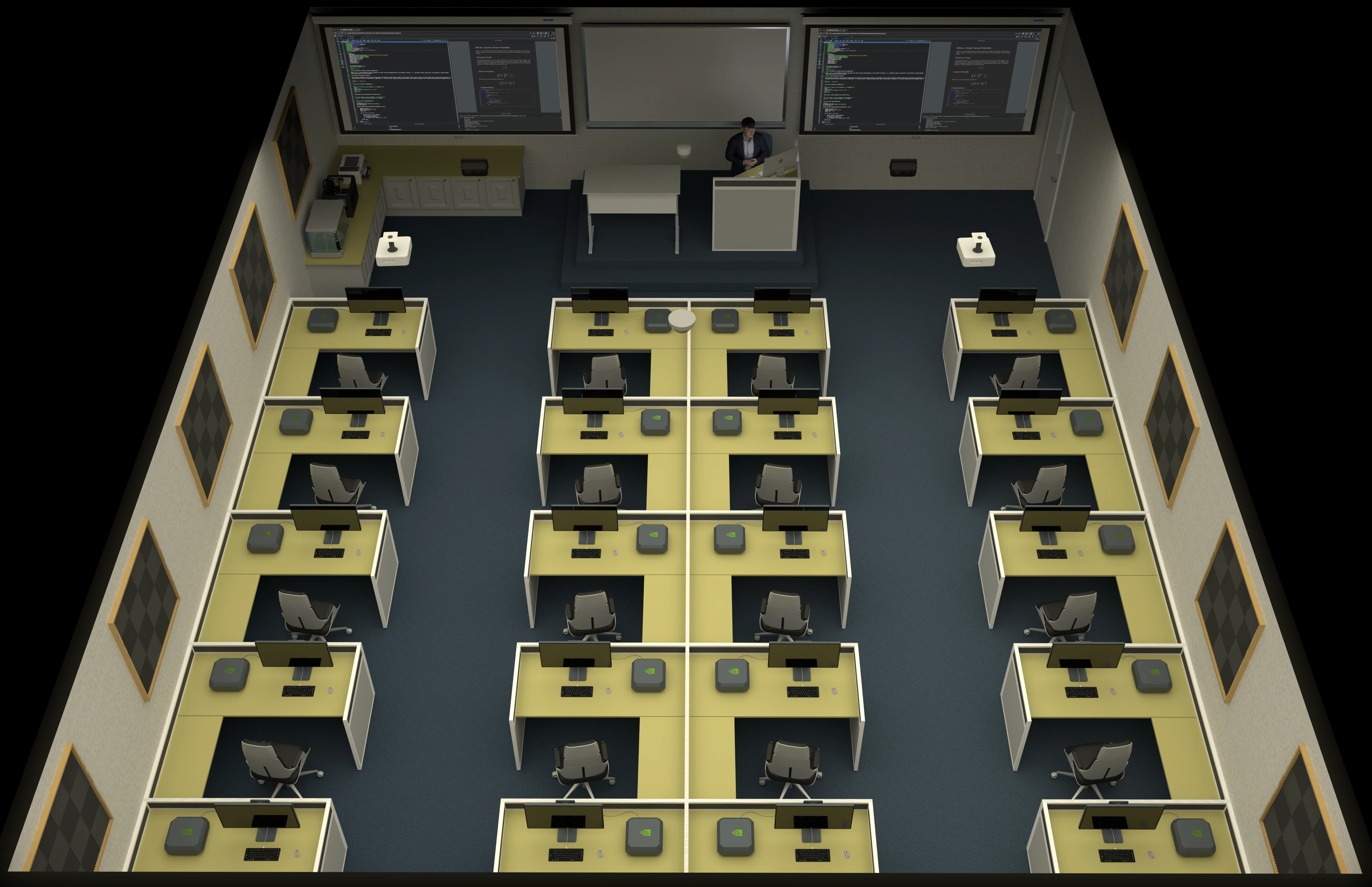
3D sketch of powered carrel cubicals to get computers on the desk in the classroom for computational education, computer-based mathematics, CAD, CAM, BIM, computer-aided engineering, computer programming, animation software, science software applications, and more.

Classroom computer access to Web 2.0 applications such as online learning communities and interactive educational tools offer a more dynamic learning experience, with direct benefits to students. Web 2.0 technologies that are being utilized within the classroom have made it possible for essential learning to be introduced to students during their elementary levels of education and to be refined through their middle, high school and collegiate experiences. As classroom computer technology is being used for different types of communication—for presentation, for class interaction, and for collaboration, students are required to be readers and writers, editors and publishers; and must be willing to collaborate and co-create with others, working closely together to learn even more in the process. Web 2.0 Interaction involves not only sharing ideas or information with someone else, but also receiving feedback. The collaboration engages groups of people in not only sending and receiving feedback but working together for creating, building, and editing, These skills are a necessity for students' futures as they grow and enter the workplace.

The goal of using such computer applications is to increase peer-to-peer interactions through digital means, in order to replicate real-life 21st century communication skills. One such technology that has gained significant recognition within K-12 education is the Weblog. Weblogs, or blogs, are frequently accessed on classroom computers due to their positive effects upon students. These online journals are primarily used to support communication in the form of presentation, and they provide a useful tool for class interaction. Weblogs allow students to present their own findings and discoveries to an authentic audience. Receiving feedback about course work not just from your teacher but from your peers, or possibly from the outside world, can be very empowering to students. In their eyes, having the ability to publish their writing on a blog suddenly transforms them into authors and publishers. Blogs make students are of careful and conscientious writing. Students are no longer writing for an audience of one. Instead, their words face an audience of their peers as well as countless others whose primary goal is not only to read, but also to provide commentary, feedback and even to critique and criticize their words. By using classroom computers for such means, students become increasingly more cautious and aware of their grammar, spelling and word-choice knowing that they are the authors of a published piece of writing that will reach a wide audience.

Similarly, Wikis are commonly accessed on classroom computers due to their positive impacts. The collaborative environment that wikis facilitate can teach students much about how to work with others, how to create community, and how to operate in a world where the creation of knowledge and information is increasingly becoming a group effort. The implementations and uses of wikis range from the development of group-based writing projects, to collaborative note taking, to brainstorming. Teachers can set up wikis for groups of students, giving them the opportunity to all join in on equal footing to give feedback, to make suggestions and changes, and to jot down ideas. With a wiki, everyone is an author of the wiki at the same time. For example, "Teaching with Technology" is an annual survey that asks teachers about technology in the classroom. Survey findings found it was found that 38.37% of teachers said that technology has had an extremely positive impact on education and 36.63% said that technology has mostly had a positive impact on education.

Additionally, Wikis afford students the opportunity to express themselves using multiple modalities. Therefore, children who struggle to express themselves through the written word, are now at ease due to ability to insert music, graphics, video, and photos into their writing. With the help of this technology, students who struggle with language are now able to create multimodal compositions, allowing them to communicate meanings that were once inaccessible or not fully expressed through their printed word. These ongoing collaborative efforts also reinforce the notion of careful, contentious writing. Students' words are no longer for an audience of one, but instead for an audience of countless individuals. The awareness of this global reach reminds students to be cautious with grammar, word choice and style as they know that others will be expanding upon their written ideas.

Because of their versatility, Podcasts are also commonly accessed on classroom computers. These downloadable, portable files allow listeners to subscribe to digitally recorded audio clips and replay them at their own convenience. Similarly, the use of Vodcasts has become almost as common, as they allow for students to view digitally recorded video on classroom computers. Accessing Podcasts and Vodcasts on classroom computers allows for differentiated instruction within the classroom environment. These technologies provide students with the opportunity to learn at their own pace and the freedom to go back whenever possible and as frequently as necessary in order to check their understanding. Podcasts are offering ESL students, and those with learning disabilities, the chance to review lectures at their own pace for increased comprehension. In fact, research was conducted to see how technology could help the visually impaired in the classroom. It showed that the visually impaired students found technology is better for them, compared to the regular paper. This demonstrated that they can learn for themselves in a classroom. In this case, the iPad2, helped increase the reading speed of those visually impaired compared to the large printed text on paper. Many ELL and ESL students need additional support with defining commonly used language as well as with the pronunciation of new vocabulary. Other students, such as those with special needs have difficulty reading and reviewing complex texts. Accessing Podcasts and Vodcasts on classroom computers can easily provide helpful tools to address these students' needs.

=== Ineffective use ===
Intrinsic barriers such as a belief in more traditional teaching practices and individual attitudes towards computers in education as well as the teachers own comfort with computers and their ability to use them all result in varying effectiveness in the integrations of computers in the classroom. Even with the increased access to computers within education systems the actual use of computers in the class room lacks meaningful activities that involve the students. Teachers also appear to abandon the intended educational uses of the computers purely for communication between staff and parents as well as preparation of more traditional learning materials. A survey collected data from 306 in-service teachers from eight secondary schools. One concept that was found in the research was that for the individual category, which included personal skills and feelings, saw that anxiety and computer self-efficiency had an impact on the teachers ability to teach. Through different organizational skill sets, technology could either be stressful and negative or reinforcing and positive for teachers.

== See also ==
- Career and technical education
