= Megan Loef Franke =

American educational psychologist

Megan Loef Franke (also published as Megan Marie Loef) is an American educational psychologist. She is a professor of education at the University of California, Los Angeles, where she studies the development of mathematical thought in early childhood and its implications for the education system.

== Education and career ==
After a 1982 bachelor's degree at the University of California, Santa Cruz, and two years of work as an elementary school teacher in Venice, California, Franke continued her studies at the University of Wisconsin–Madison. There, she received a master's degree in 1988 and a Ph.D. in 1990, in educational psychology. Her dissertation was Understanding teachers' knowledge about building instruction on children's mathematical thinking: Application of a personal construct approach.

She continued at the University of Wisconsin as a postdoctoral researcher on the Cognitively Guided Instruction Project until 1993, when she took a faculty position at the University of California, Los Angeles. She was the director of "Center X: Where Research & Practice Intersect for Urban School Professionals" from 2001 to 2008, and department chair from 2008 to 2013.

== Recognition ==
Franke received the 2012 Relating Research to Practice Award of the American Educational Research Association (AERA), in its professional service category. She was one of three researchers from UCLA and the University of Wisconsin to receive the 2013 Henry T. Trueba Award for Research Leading to the Transformation of the Social Contexts of Education in the collective research category, of Division G of AERA.

She was elected to the National Academy of Education in 2017.
