= Carrel desk =

Type of furniture found in academic settings

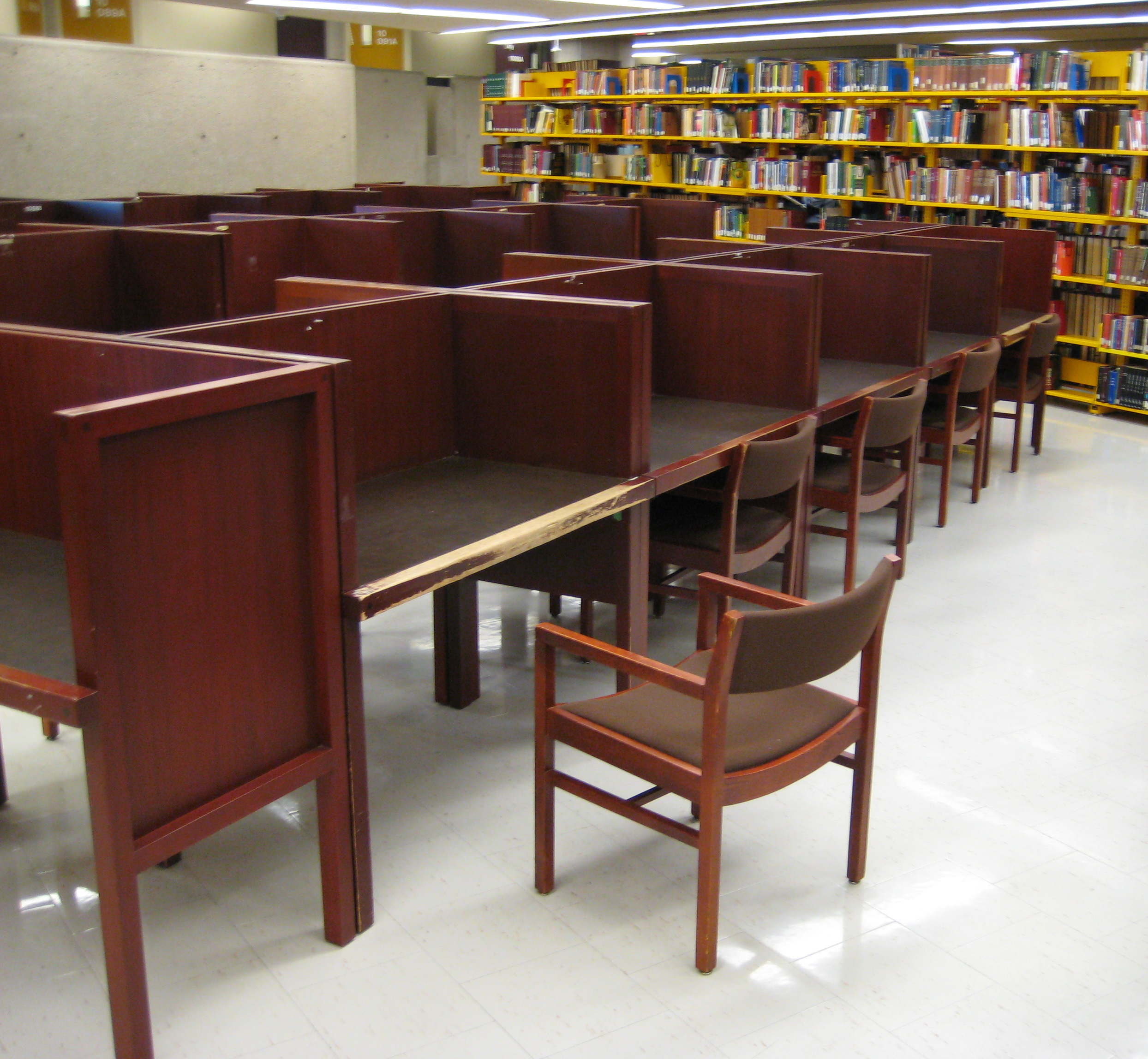
A set of study carrels in a library.

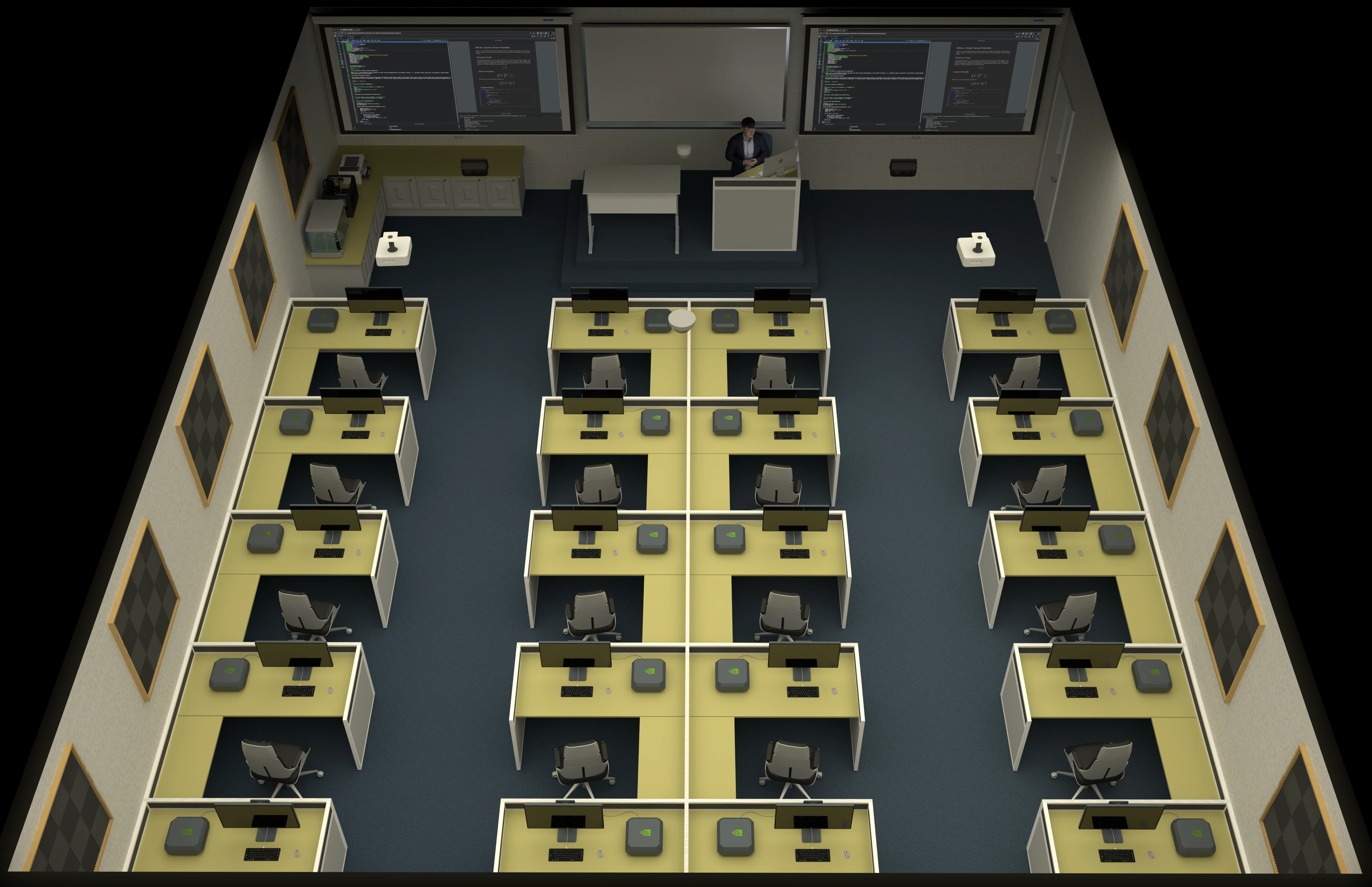
Digital carrel classroom 3D sketch

A carrel desk is a desk, often found in libraries, with partitions at back and sides to provide privacy.

== Description ==
Carrel desks are especially common in academic libraries. Sometimes the seat is integrated with the carrel desk. They may also have a shelf, built-in illumination, electrical outlets, or Ethernet ports. Unlike the cubicle desk, carrel desks usually have no file drawers or other facilities. They are designed to stand alone or to be grouped together, with or without common sides or walls.

The word carrel may also refer to a small, isolated "study room" in public libraries and on university campuses; the room may have a lockable door, to which the user is granted the key on request. Carrels typically contain a desk (not necessarily one described as above), shelving and a lamp.

== Origins ==
Carrels originated in monasteries to help contain the cacophony of roomfuls of monks reading aloud, as was the early practice. Carrels are first recorded in the 13th century at Westminster Abbey, London, on the Garth side of the North Walk, though they probably existed from the late years of the 12th century.

== See also ==
- List of desk forms and types
