= Hal Abelson =

American mathematician (born 1947)

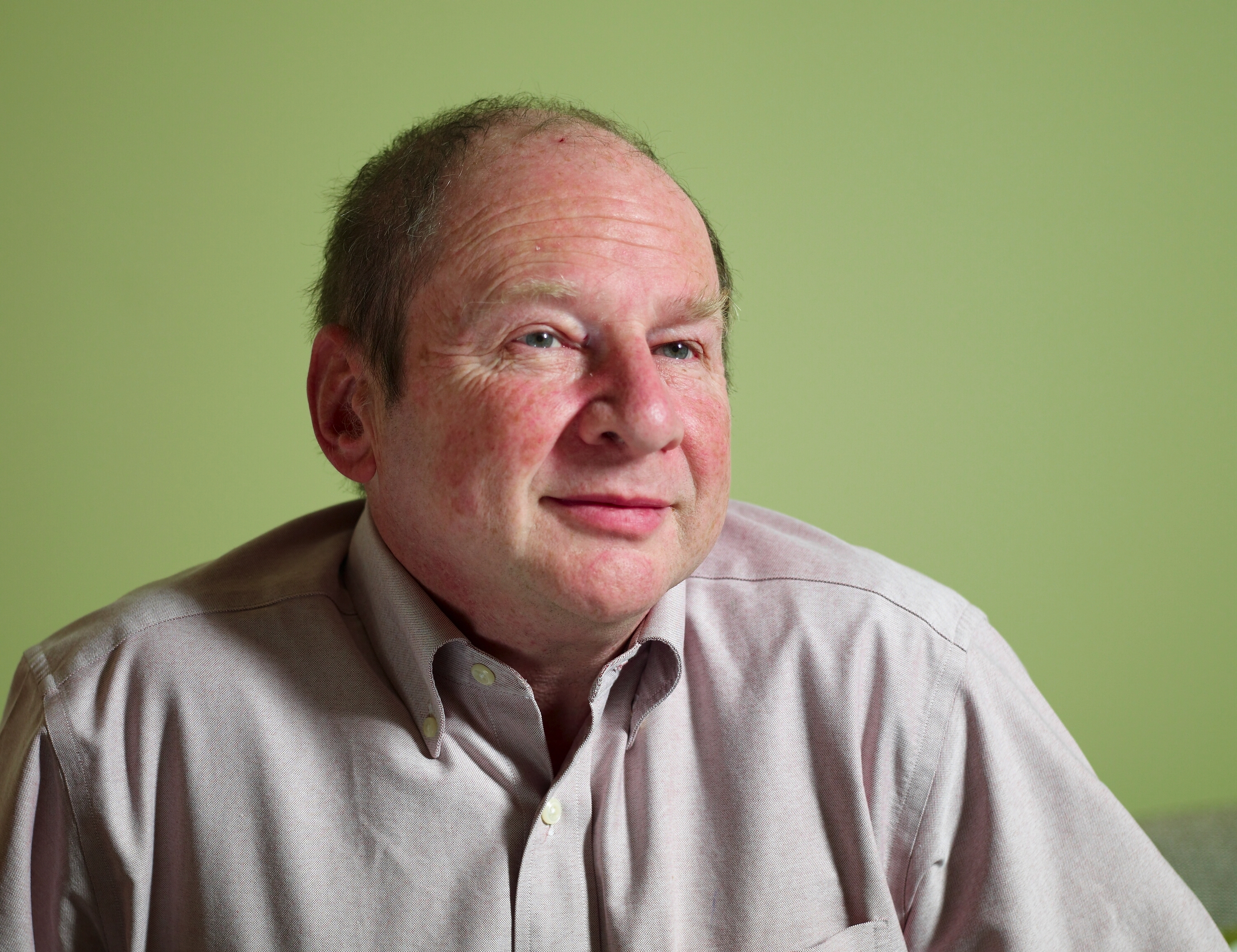
- Abelson in 2007
- Born: Harold Abelson; April 26, 1947 (age 79)
- Education: Princeton University (BA); Massachusetts Institute of Technology (PhD)
- Known for: Creative Commons; Public Knowledge; Free Software Foundation; OpenCourseWare; Structure and Interpretation of Computer Programs (SICP)
- Awards: SIGCSE Award for Outstanding Contribution to Computer Science Education (2012)
- Scientific career
- Fields: Computer science education Amorphous computing
- Workplaces: Massachusetts Institute of Technology
- Thesis: Topologically Distinct Conjugate-Varieties with Finite Fundamental-Group (1973)
- Doctoral advisor: Dennis Sullivan
- Doctoral students: Elizabeth Bradley; Mitchel Resnick; Latanya Sweeney
- Website: www.csail.mit.edu/person/hal-abelson

Harold Abelson (born April 26, 1947) is an American mathematician and computer scientist. He is a professor of computer science and engineering in the Department of Electrical Engineering and Computer Science at the Massachusetts Institute of Technology (MIT), a founding director of both Creative Commons and the Free Software Foundation, creator of the MIT App Inventor platform, and co-author of the widely used textbook Structure and Interpretation of Computer Programs (SICP), sometimes also referred to as "the wizard book" because of its cover illustration.

He directed the first implementation of the language Logo for the Apple II, which made the language widely available on personal computers starting in 1981; and published a widely selling book on Logo in 1982. Together with Gerald Jay Sussman, Abelson developed MIT's introductory computer science subject, "The Structure and Interpretation of Computer Programs" (often referred to by the MIT course number, 6.001), a subject organized around the idea that a computer language is primarily a formal medium for expressing ideas about methodology, rather than just a way to get a computer to perform operations.

Abelson and Sussman also cooperate in codirecting the MIT Project on Mathematics and Computation. The MIT OpenCourseWare (OCW) project was spearheaded by Abelson and other MIT faculty.

Abelson led an internal investigation of MIT's choices and role in the prosecution of Aaron Swartz by the Federal Bureau of Investigation (FBI), which concluded that MIT did nothing wrong legally, but recommended that MIT consider changing some of its internal policies.

== Education ==
Abelson graduated with a Bachelor of Arts degree in mathematics from Princeton University in 1969 after completing a senior thesis on Actions with fixed-point set: a homology sphere, supervised by William Browder.

He received his PhD in mathematics from the Massachusetts Institute of Technology in 1973 after completing his research on Topologically distinct conjugate varieties with finite fundamental group supervised by Dennis Sullivan.

== Career and research ==
Abelson is also a founding director of Creative Commons and Public Knowledge, and a director of the Center for Democracy and Technology.

=== Computer science education ===
Abelson has a longstanding interest in using computation as a conceptual framework in teaching. He directed the first implementation of Logo for the Apple II, which made the language widely available on personal computers starting in 1981; and published a widely selling book on Logo in 1982. His book Turtle Geometry, written with Andrea diSessa in 1981, presented a computational approach to geometry which has been cited as "the first step in a revolutionary change in the entire teaching/learning process." In March 2015, a copy of Abelson's 1969 implementation of Turtle graphics was sold at The Algorithm Auction, the world's first auction of computer algorithms.

Together with Gerald Jay Sussman, Abelson developed MIT's introductory computer science subject, Structure and Interpretation of Computer Programs, a subject organized around the notion that a computer language is primarily a formal medium for expressing ideas about methodology, rather than just a way to get a computer to perform operations. This work, through the textbook of the same name, videotapes of their lectures, and the availability on personal computers of the Scheme dialect of Lisp (used in teaching the course), has had a worldwide impact on university computer science education.

He is a visiting faculty member at Google, where he was part of the App Inventor for Android team, an educational program aiming to make it easy for people with no programming background to write mobile phone applications and "explore whether this could change the nature of introductory computing". He is coauthor of the book App Inventor with David Wolber, Ellen Spertus, and Liz Looney, published by O'Reilly Media in 2011. After Google released App Inventor as open source software in late 2009 and provided seed funding to the MIT Media Lab in 2011, Abelson became codirector of the MIT Center for Mobile Learning to continue development of App Inventor.

=== Computing tools ===
Abelson and Sussman also cooperate in codirecting the MIT Project on Mathematics and Computation, a project of the MIT Computer Science and Artificial Intelligence Laboratory (CSAIL), formerly a joint project of the MIT Artificial Intelligence Laboratory (AI Lab) and MIT Laboratory for Computer Science (LCS), CSAIL's components. The goal of the project is to create better computational tools for scientists and engineers. But even with powerful numerical computers, exploring complex physical systems still requires substantial human effort and human judgement to prepare simulations and to interpret numerical results.

Together with their students, Abelson and Sussman are combining methods from numerical computation, symbolic algebra, and heuristic programming to develop programs that not only perform massive numerical computations, but that also interpret these computations and discuss the results in qualitative terms. Programs such as these could form the basis for intelligent scientific instruments that monitor physical systems based upon high-level behavioral descriptions. More generally, they could lead to a new generation of computational tools that can autonomously explore complex physical systems, and which will play an important part in the future practice of science and engineering. At the same time, these programs incorporate computational formulations of scientific knowledge that can form the foundations of better ways to teach science and engineering.

=== Free software movement ===
Abelson and Sussman have also been a part of the free software movement (FSM), including serving on the board of directors of the Free Software Foundation (FSF).

Abelson is known to have been involved in publishing Andrew Huang's Hacking the Xbox and Keith Winstein's seven-line Perl DeCSS script (named qrpff), and Library Access to Music Project (LAMP), MIT's campus-wide music distribution system. The MIT OpenCourseWare (OCW) project was spearheaded by Hal Abelson and other MIT faculty.

=== Aaron Swartz investigation ===
In January 2013, open access activist Aaron Swartz died by suicide. He had been arrested near MIT and was facing up to 35 years imprisonment for the alleged crime of downloading Journal Storage (JSTOR) articles through MIT's open access campus network.

In response, MIT appointed professor Hal Abelson to lead an internal investigation of the school's choices and role in the prosecution of Aaron Swartz by the FBI. The report was delivered on July 26, 2013. It concluded that MIT did nothing wrong legally, but recommended that MIT consider changing some of its internal policies.

=== Awards and honors ===
- Designated as one of MIT's six inaugural MacVicar Faculty Fellows, in 1992, in recognition of his significant and sustained contributions to teaching and undergraduate education
- 1992 Bose Award, the MIT School of Engineering teaching award
- 1995 Taylor L. Booth Education Award, given by IEEE Computer Society, cited for his continued contributions to the pedagogy and teaching of introductory computer science
- 2011 ACM Karl V. Karlstrom Outstanding Educator Award for "his contribution to computing education, through his innovative advances in curricula designed for students pursuing different kinds of computing expertise, and for his leadership in the movement for open educational resources"
- 2012 Association for Computing Machinery (ACM) SIGCSE Award for Outstanding Contribution to Computer Science Education

=== Publications ===
- Structure and Interpretation of Computer Programs
- Turtle Geometry: The Computer As a Medium for Exploring Mathematics
- Blown to Bits: Your Life, Liberty, and Happiness After the Digital Explosion
- App Inventor 2: Create Your Own Android Apps
