= Skype for Business Server =

Real-time communications server software

- Developer: Microsoft
- Stable release: Subscription Edition (SE) (7.0.2046.820) / 18 August 2025; 7 months ago
- Preview release: 2019 / 24 July 2018; 7 years ago
- Operating system: Microsoft Windows
- Platform: x86-64
- Type: Instant messaging, collaborative software
- Website: products.office.com/skype-for-business/

Skype for Business Server (formerly Microsoft Office Communications Server and Microsoft Lync Server) is real-time communications server software that provides the infrastructure for enterprise instant messaging, presence, VoIP, ad hoc and structured conferences (audio, video and web conferencing) and PSTN connectivity through a third-party gateway or SIP trunk. These features are available within an organization, between organizations and with external users on the public internet or standard phones (on the PSTN as well as SIP trunking).

== Features ==
One basic use of Skype for Business Server is instant messaging (IM) and presence within a single organization. This includes support for rich presence information, file transfer and voice and video communication. Skype for Business Server uses Interactive Connectivity Establishment for NAT traversal and TLS encryption to enable secure voice and video both inside and outside the corporate network.

Skype for Business Server also supports remote users, both corporate users on the Internet (e.g. mobile or home workers) as well as users in partner companies. Skype for Business supports identity federation, enabling interoperability with other corporate IM networks. Federation can be configured either manually (where each partner manually configures the relevant edge servers in the other organization) or automatically (using the appropriate SRV records in the DNS).

Microsoft Skype for Business Server uses Session Initiation Protocol (SIP) for signaling along with the SIMPLE extensions to SIP for IM and presence. Media is transferred using RTP and SRTP. The live meeting client uses Persistent Shared Object Model (PSOM) to download meeting content. The communicator client also uses HTTPS to connect with the web components server to download address books and expand distribution lists. By default, supported combinations include encrypted communications using SIP over TLS and SRTP as well as unencrypted SIP over TCP and RTP. Microsoft has published details of supported configuration for qualified vendors through Unified Communications Open Interoperability Program (UCOIP).

IM is only one portion of the Skype for Business suite. The other major components are VoIP telephony and video conferencing through the desktop communicator client. Remote access is possible using the desktop, mobile and web clients.

Several third parties have incorporated Skype for Business functionality on existing platforms. HP has implemented it on its Halo video conferencing platform.

== History ==
When Microsoft Office Live Communications Server was originally launched on 29 December 2003, it replaced the Exchange Instant Messenger Service that had been included in Exchange 2000, but which was removed from the Exchange 2003 feature set. Holders of Exchange 2000 licenses which included Software Assurance were entitled to receive Live Communications Server as an upgrade, along with Exchange 2003; however, Live Communications Server Client Access Licenses were purchased as normal for new users.

OCS R2 was announced at VoiceCon in Amsterdam in October 2008, a year after releasing Office Communications Server 2007.

Microsoft released Microsoft Office Communications Server 2007 R2 in February 2009. The R2 release added the following features:

- Dial-in audioconferencing
- Desktop sharing
- Persistent Group Chat (only available on Windows OS clients)
- Attendant console and delegation
- Session Initiation Protocol trunking
- Mobility and single-number reach

Microsoft Lync Server 2010 reached general availability in November 2010. Microsoft Lync 2013 was released to manufacturing in October 2012 with SP1 being released in March 2014. In 2015, the new version of Lync became Skype for Business with a new client experience, new server release and updates to the service in Office 365. Microsoft has stated that general availability for Skype for Business Server 2019 is targeted for the end of 2018. Skype for Business Server 2019's Mainstream Support ended on January 9th, 2024 and Extended Support was discontinued on October 14th, 2025.

=== Versions ===
- 2025 - Skype for Business Server Subscription Edition (SE)
- 2018 - Skype for Business Server 2019
- 2015 - Skype for Business Server 2015
- 2012 - Lync Server 2013 (RTM 11 October 2012)
- 2010 - Lync Server 2010
- 2009 - Office Communications Server 2007 R2
- 2007 - Office Communications Server 2007
- 2006 - Live Communications Server 2005 with SP1
- 2005 - Live Communications Server 2005, codenamed Vienna
- 2003 - Live Communications Server 2003

== Client software and devices ==
Microsoft Lync is the primary client application released with Lync Server. This client is used for IM, presence, voice and video calls, desktop sharing, file transfer and ad hoc conferences. With Lync 2013 there will be a release of Lync Light Client with fewer features. Microsoft also ships the Microsoft Attendant Console. This is a version of the Lync more oriented towards receptionists or delegates / secretaries or others who get a large volume of inbound calls.

Persistent Group Chat functionality (introduced with Lync Server 2010) is only supported on the Windows OS client at this time. This requires an additional server or multiple servers for processing group chat transactions.

Other client software and devices include:

- Lync Mobile is a mobile edition of the Lync Server 2010 client that offers similar functionality, including voice calls via the GSM network, instant messaging, presence and single number reachability. Clients for Lync Mobile includes the IPhone, IPad, Android, Windows Phone 7 and 8. New releases of Lync Mobile 2013 (Wave 2) are anticipated, bringing features such as collaboration and voice and video over IP.
- Microsoft RoundTable is an audio and video conferencing device that provides a 360-degree view of the conference room and tracks the various speakers. This device is now produced and sold via Polycom under the product name CX5000.
- The Skype for Business client is supported by Lync Server 2013, as well as Skype for Business Server.

The documentation of Lync 2013 contains references to Lync Room Edition Devices - these are anticipated to provide close to immersive experience.

- LG-Nortel and Polycom also make IP phones in a traditional phone form factor that operate an embedded edition of Office Communicator 2007. The physical plastic phones as referred by Microsoft are also named Tanjay Phones.
- IP Desk Phones 'Optimized for Lync': Powered by Lync Phone Edition these phones have full support to PBX functionalities, access to calendar and contacts, rich conferencing, extended functionalities when connected to the PC, and integrated security and manageability. Built from the ground up for Lync, these phones come in different models designed to meet specific business needs, including a rich information worker experience, a basic desk phone, common area phone, or conference room phone. Aastra and other vendors offer IP Desk Phones Optimized for Microsoft Lync.
- Damaka has Lync clients for Android, iOS (iPhone/iPad), BlackBerry, Symbian, Windows 8, Mac OS X. It provides chat, voice, file transfer, video, and desktop sharing functions.
- Fisil has Lync clients for Linux, Android, iPhone, iPad.

Linux support:

Fisil makes the only available supported Linux client for Lync. The unifiedme.co.uk reference lists a Pidgin-based workaround, but according to the information at CERN, it has important limitations. The Damaka reference leads to the Google+ main page and has no information on a Linux client that I could find. The Fisil reference goes to a project management company that can write custom software.

== Compliance ==
Lync Server also has the capability to log and archive all instant message traffic passing through the server and to create Call Detail Records for conferences and voice. These features can help provide compliance with legal requirements for many organizations. The Archiving server is not an overall end-to-end compliance solution, as archiving requires you to install the Archiving Server and to configure front end servers accordingly.

== Public IM connectivity (PIC) ==
Lync Server also enables organizations to interoperate with four external IM services: AOL Instant Messenger, Microsoft Messenger service, Yahoo! Messenger, and Google Talk. PIC was first introduced with Service Pack 1 for Live Communications Server 2005, PIC is licensed separately for Yahoo, but is free for AOL and Messenger service for customers with Software Assurance. Microsoft announced that effective 30 June 2014, they will no longer support PIC connectivity to AOL/AIM

== Third-party software support ==
=== SIPE plugin ===
As of 2012, the third-party SIPE plugin enables third-party clients such as Pidgin, Adium and Miranda NG as well as clients using the Telepathy framework to support MS Lync Servers with some limitation (Audio but no SRTP, No Video) via the extended version of SIP/SIMPLE.

=== XMPP ===
Lync Server has an XMPP gateway server to federate with external XMPP servers. With Lync Server 2013, XMPP is natively part of the product.

The ejabberd XMPP server has a bridge that enables federation with OCS servers, without gateways (transports).

== Competition ==
Competitors to Lync Server include:

- Alcatel-Lucent Enterprise OpenTouch Conversation Platform
- 3CX Phone System; 3CX Phone System for Windows is a software-based IP PBX
- Alceo's BCS Communicator
- Asterisk (PBX) Platform - SIP, ISDN, IAX, SMS, open source telephone system
- AT&T UC and SIP Services
- Avaya Aura Presence Services (with Messaging) and one-X software
- Bopup Communication Server; Based on private and secure IM protocol
- Cisco's Unified Communications Manager IM & Presence (on-Prem) or WebEx Connect Jabber Service (Cisco cloud)
- ejabberd
- Elastix; Elastix PBX, VoIP email, IM, faxing and collaboration functionality
- eZuce openUC Enterprise
- IBM's Lotus Sametime
- iChat Server (see Mac OS X Server)
- Jabber XCP (from Jabber, Inc., not to be confused with the IETF open standard XMPP)
- NEC's UCB and UCE
- Mitel Micollab
- Openfire
- Prosody
- ShoreTel
- Siemens' OpenScape
- sipXecs
- Sun Java System Instant Messaging (see Sun Java System Communications Suite)
- Swyx
- Tigase
- TrueConf
- Vertical Communications
- Algoria; TWS

In instant messaging, the free public instant messaging networks (Google, Live Messenger, Yahoo and AOL) are widely used and represent a degree of competition. There have been attempts by other vendors at providing solutions such as Yahoo!'s Enterprise Instant Messenger; however these attempts have been largely unsuccessful. An ICQ corporate client and server option once existed, but it is no longer supported or developed.

Products such as Cisco Unified Presence Server (Version 6.0.2+) support federation with Microsoft Office Communication Server 2007 to provide presence of Cisco IP phones and remote call control of the IP phone from the Microsoft Office Communicator client.

The Siemens OpenScape solution offers a federation with the Office communicator, and also an integration into the office communicator, allowing to use the standard functionalities of the office communication suite together with the SIP based voice functionalities of the Siemens platform.

The Asterisk telephone platform supports SIP, IAX, and ISDN connections. Most telephones that support these protocols may be used with Asterisk, including software phone clients.

== See also ==
Similar products

- LG-Nortel IP Phone 8540

Lists

- List of Microsoft–Nortel Innovative Communications Alliance products
- Microsoft Servers
