= Innovative Communications Alliance =

Telecommunications alliance between Microsoft and Nortel

The Innovative Communications Alliance (ICA) was a telecommunications alliance between Microsoft and Nortel, created in July 2006, to co-develop, integrate, market, sell, and support unified communications products. The goal of the alliance is to make integrated hardware and software solutions that join together voice, video, and data communications without requiring gateways or middleware. Microsoft and Nortel share developing technologies and patents for unified communications products.

== Formation of alliance ==
Nortel and Microsoft announced the Innovative Communications Alliance in July 2006. Nortel and Microsoft agreed to share patents, technology, marketing, and development for unified communications products. The companies have integrated Microsoft Office 2007 applications with the Nortel telecommunication hardware (Communication Server 2100, Communication Server 1000, Secure Router 4134, and LG-Nortel IP Phone 8540), in order to provide unified enterprise communications products such as secure instant messaging, presence (a user's availability), voice and video telephony, and web conferencing.

The alliance competes with other competitors in instant messaging such as Google Talk, Office SIP Messenger, Miranda NG, and AIM. Many of these other products offer instant messaging, Voice over IP (VOIP), and file transfers at little or no cost.

== Joint solutions ==
Various Nortel products have been integrated with Microsoft Office Communications Server 2007, including:

- Nortel Secure Router 4134: support remote business sites.
- Nortel Multimedia Conferencing: support dial-in audio conferencing for non-Microsoft Office Communications Server users
- Nortel Converged Office: integrate voice services of the Nortel Communication Server 1000 IP-PBX and Communication Server 2100 IP-PBX

The Carrier Hosted Unified Communications Solution combines the Nortel Communication Server 2000 softswitch with Microsoft Office Communications Server 2000 and Exchange Server 2007 Unified Messaging to provide instant messaging, voice services, video conferencing, and other multimedia services.

As of January 2007, British and Dutch Royal Dutch Shell had deployed approximate 2,000 Nortel phones to work with the Microsoft Office Communicator client. ASUSteK Computer is using unified communications solutions from Nortel and Microsoft for its internal communications.

=== Unified communications products ===
- LG-Nortel IP Phone 8540
- LG-Nortel USB Phone 8501
- Microsoft Office 2007
- Microsoft Office Communication Server 2007 (OCS 2007)
- Microsoft Office Communicator
- Microsoft Exchange Server
- Nortel Communication Server 2100
- Nortel Communication Server 1000
- Nortel Secure Router 4134

== Competing solutions ==
In March, 2007, Cisco and IBM announced an alliance to bring together "Sametime collaboration" and Cisco Unified Communications Portfolio, to compete against the Nortel-Microsoft product offerings.

== See also ==
- Microsoft Office 2007
- Unified communications
- Microsoft Office Communications Server
- Unified Messaging
- List of Microsoft - Nortel (ICA) products
- WebEx
