= Computer literacy =

Skill in using computers and digital technology

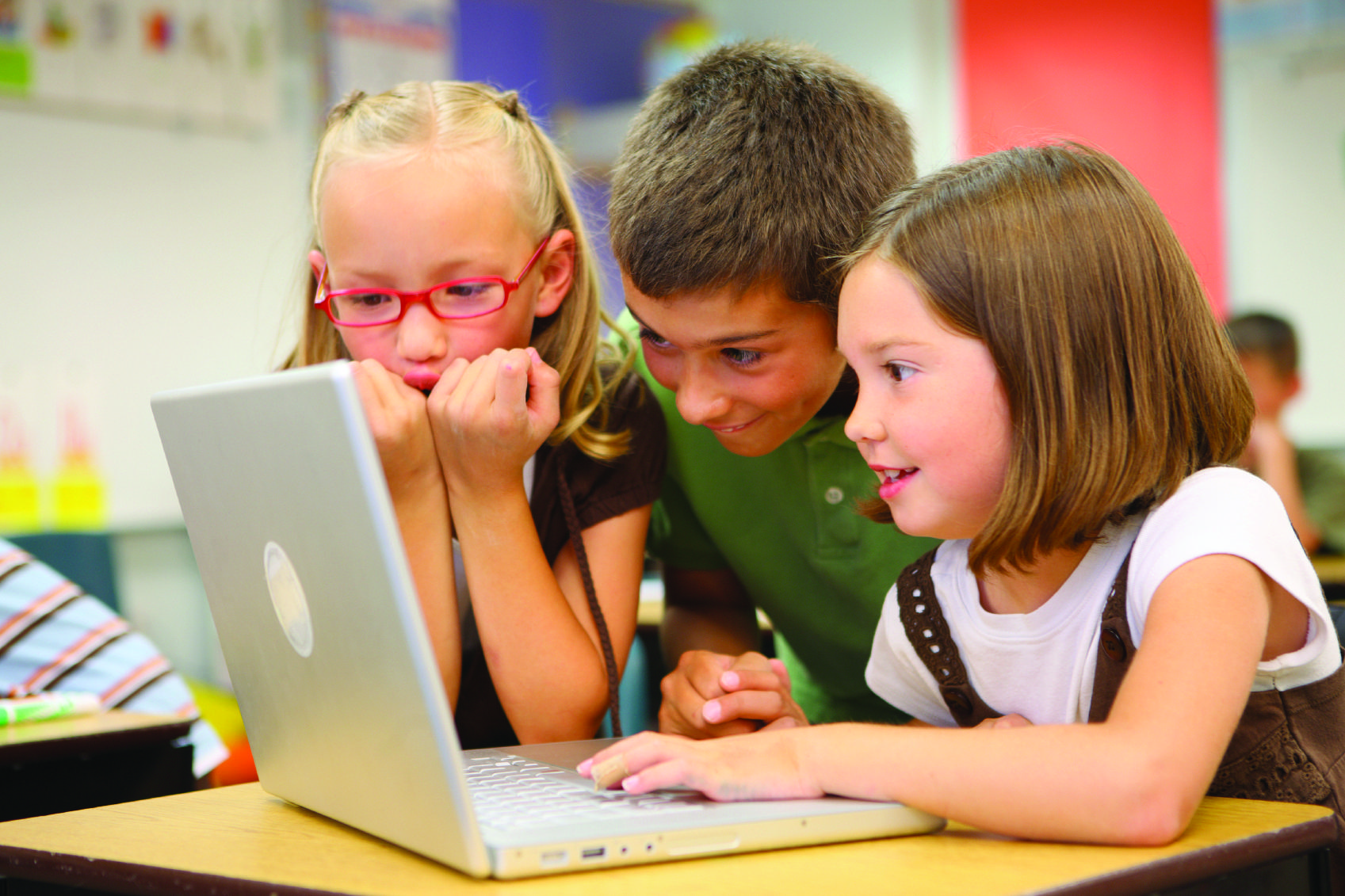
Children using a laptop computer at school (2008)

"Computer literacy" is defined as the knowledge and ability to use computers and related technology efficiently, with skill levels ranging from elementary use to computer programming and advanced problem solving. Computer literacy involves more than knowing how to operate a computer. It also includes finding information online, communicating through digital platforms, solving problems using technology, and understanding online safety. As technology continues to develop, these skills have become important for education, employment, and everyday activities. Computer literacy can also refer to the comfort level someone has with using computer programs and applications. Another valuable component is understanding how computers work and operate. Computer literacy may be distinguished from computer programming, which primarily focuses on the design and coding of computer programs rather than the familiarity and skill in their use. Various countries, including the United Kingdom and the United States, have created initiatives to improve national computer literacy rates.

== Background ==
Computer literacy differs from digital literacy, which is the ability to communicate or find information on digital platforms. Comparatively, computer literacy measures the ability to use computers and to maintain a basic understanding of how they operate.

A person's computer literacy is commonly measured through questionnaires, which test their ability to write and modify text, trouble-shoot minor computer operating issues, and organize and analyze information on a computer.

To increase their computer literacy, computer users should distinguish which computer skills they want to improve, and learn to be more purposeful and accurate in their use of these skills. By learning more about computer literacy, users can discover more computer functions that are worth using.

Arguments for the use of computers in classroom settings, and thus for the promotion of computer literacy, are primarily vocational or practical. Computers are essential in the modern-day workplace. The instruction of computer literacy in education is intended to provide students with employable skills.

Rapid changes in technology make it difficult to predict the next five years of computer literacy. Computer literacy projects have support in many countries because they conform to general political and economic principles of those countries' public and private organizations. The Internet offers great potential for the effective and widespread dissemination of knowledge and for the integration of technological advances. Improvements in computer literacy facilitate this.

== History ==
The term "computer literacy" is usually attributed to Arthur Luehrmann, a physicist at Dartmouth College who was a colleague of Kemeny and Kurtz who introduced the BASIC programming language in 1964. Luehrmann became a tireless advocate of computers in teaching. At an April 1972 American Federation of Information Processing Societies (AFIPS) conference, Luehrmann gave a talk titled "Should the computer teach the student, or vice-versa?" The paper is available online. In it he notes:

If the computer is so powerful a resource that it can be programmed to simulate the instructional process, shouldn’t we be teaching our students mastery of this powerful intellectual tool? Is it enough that a student be the subject of computer administered instruction—the enduser of a new technology? Or should his education also include learning to use the computer (1) to get information in the social sciences from a large database inquiry system, or (2) to simulate an ecological system, or (3) to solve problems by using algorithms, or (4) to acquire laboratory data and analyze it, or (5) to represent textual information for editing and analysis, or (6) to represent musical information for analysis, or (7) to create and process graphical information? These uses of computers in education cause students to become masters of computing, not merely its subjects.

In 1978, Andrew Molnar was director of the Office of Computing Activities at the National Science Foundation in the United States. Shortly after its formation, computer literacy was discussed in several academic articles. In 1985 the Journal of Higher Education asserted that being computer literate involved mastering word processing, spreadsheet programs, and retrieving and sharing information on a computer.

Computer science and education researchers Seymour Papert, Cynthia Solomon, and Daniel McCracken advocated for programming as a rich and beneficial activity for young and old learners. In the 1970s and 1980s, creative technical writers including Bob Albrecht, David Ahl, Mitchell Waite, Peter Norton, and Dan Gookin created books and materials that taught computer programming to non-specialists and self-taught learners. While programming lost traction in school districts as the core element of computer literacy, it gained ground in computer labs, user groups, community centers and other informal settings, helping to propel the personal computer as a mass-market commercial product.

=== France ===
Plan Calcul was a French governmental program in the 1960s to promote a national or European computer industry that was accompanied by a vast educational effort in programming and computer science.

The Computing for All plan was a French government initiative to introduce computers to all the country's pupils in 1985.

=== United Kingdom ===
In the United Kingdom, a number of prominent video game developers emerged in the late 1970s and early 1980s. The ZX Spectrum, released in 1982, helped to popularize home computing, coding, and gaming in Britain and Europe.

The BBC Computer Literacy Project, using the BBC Micro computer, ran from 1980 to 1989. This initiative educated a generation of coders in schools and at home. This was before the development of mass-market PCs in the 1990s. 'Bedroom computer innovation' led to the development of early web-hosting companies aimed at businesses and individuals in the 1990s.

The BBC Computer Literacy Project 2012 was an initiative to develop students' marketable information technology and computer science skills.

Computer programming skills were introduced into the National Curriculum in 2014.

It was reported in 2017 that roughly 11.5 million United Kingdom citizens did not have basic computer literacy skills. In response, the United Kingdom government published a 'digital skills strategy' in 2017.

First released in 2012, the Raspberry Pi is a series of low-cost single-board computers originally intended to promote the teaching of basic computer science in schools in the UK. Later, they became far more popular than anticipated and have been used in a wide variety of applications. The Raspberry Pi Foundation promotes the teaching of elementary computer science in UK schools and in developing countries.

=== United States ===
In the mid 1960s, Dick Raymond was keenly interested in innovative methods in education, so he established the Portola Institute in Menlo Park (in Silicon Valley). Raymond surmised computers could nurture progress in the education field. Computer applications specialist Bob Albrecht established a computers division in the Institute. Among Portola's numerous offshoots was Bob Albrecht’s Community Computer Center, established in 1974.; Albrecht personally introduced computers to school-age children and discovered a way to teach them to write code. Also, in the early 1970s, the Portola Institute provided some funds to support the Homebrew Computer Club.

In 1978, the National Science Foundation put out a call to educate young people in computer programming. To introduce students to computing, the U.S. government, private foundations, and universities combined to fund and staff summer programs for high school students.

Students in the United States are introduced to tablet computers in preschool or kindergarten. Tablet computers are preferred for their small size and touchscreens. The touch user interface of a tablet computer is more accessible to the underdeveloped motor skills of young children. Early childhood educators use student-centered instruction to guide young students through various activities on the tablet computer. This typically includes Internet browsing and the use of applications, familiarizing the young student with a basic level of computer proficiency.

A concern raised within this topic of discussion is that primary and secondary education teachers are often not equipped with the skills to teach basic computer literacy.

In the United States job market, computer illiteracy severely limits employment options. Non-profit organizations such as Per Scholas attempt to reduce the divide by offering free and low-cost computers to children and their families in underserved communities in South Bronx, New York, Miami, FL, and in Columbus, OH.

== Worldwide computer literacy rates ==
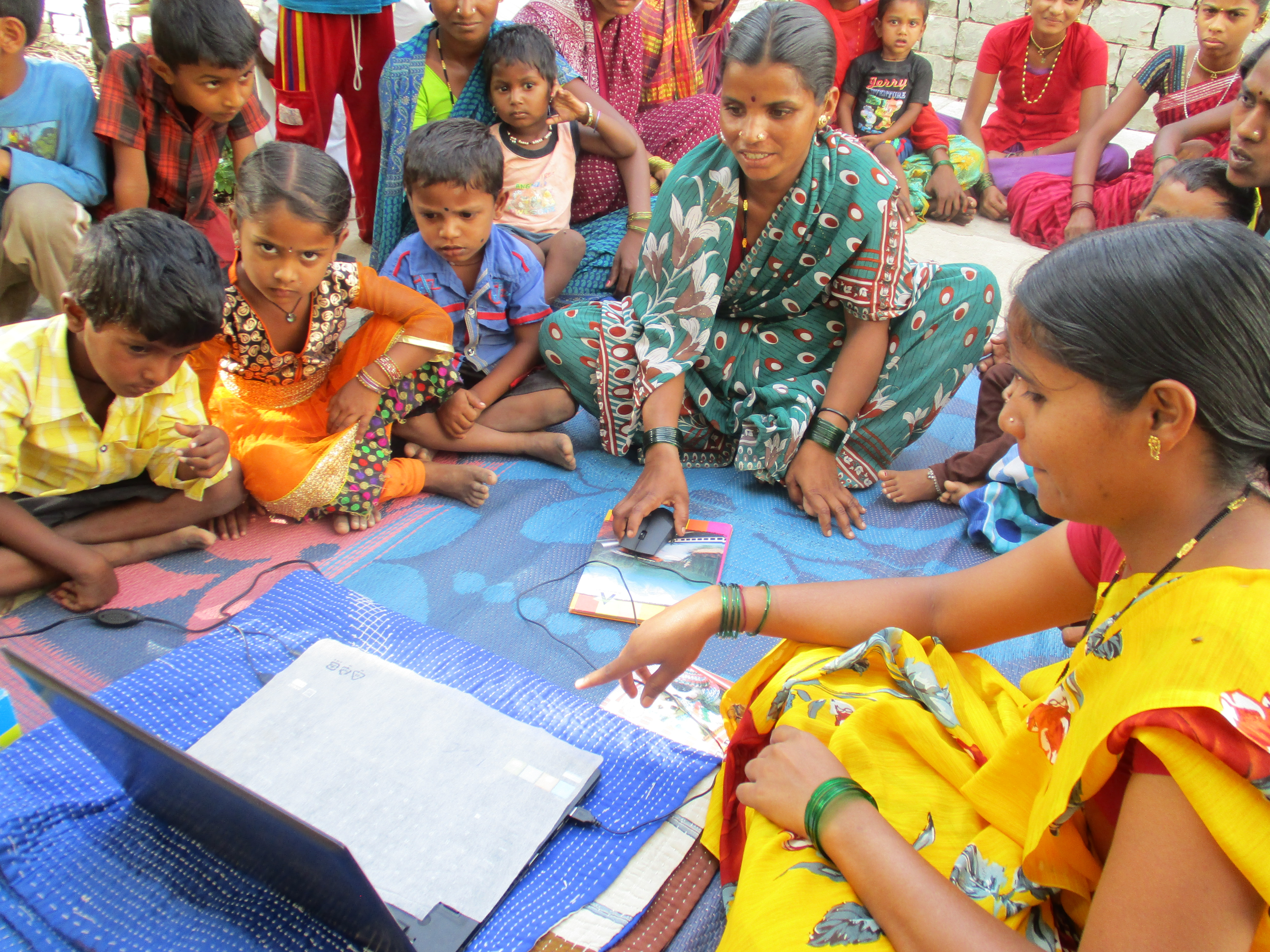
Computer class in India (2015)

According to the World Economic Forum, a survey of adult skills by the OECD revealed that their member nations were not as computer literate as one would expect. About a quarter of individuals did not know how to use a computer. At least 45% were rated poorly, and only 30% were rated as moderately to strongly computer literate.

Computer literacy also varies around the world. The International Telecommunication Union reports differences in skills across countries, showing that people do not all have the same level of experience with technology.

Access to technology can also affect opportunities to develop computer literacy. Research from Pew Research Center shows that lower income households in the United States are less likely to have access to certain digital technologies. These differences can create challenges for people trying to improve their computer skills.

== See also ==
- Computational literacy
- Computing education
- Digital divide
- Digital literacy
- History of the Internet
- Information literacy
- Transliteracy
- Web literacy

Computers

- BBC Micro
- OLPC XO
- Raspberry Pi

Initiatives

- BBC Computer Literacy Project 2012
- European Computer Driving Licence
- One Laptop per Child
