= RTVideo =

Video codec

RTVideo is Microsoft's default video codec for Office Communications Server 2007 and the Microsoft Office Communicator 2007 client. It is a Microsoft proprietary implementation of the VC-1 codec for real-time transmission purposes. Microsoft extensions to VC-1 are based on cached frame and SP-frame. It also includes system-level enhancements for recovery of packet loss on IP networks - forward error correction and error concealment.

== Licensing ==
RTVideo is a proprietary codec. Like RTAudio this protocol can also be licensed from Microsoft.
