= Andrea diSessa =

American physicist

- Born: June 3, 1947 (age 79)
- Education: Princeton University (A.B.); Massachusetts Institute of Technology (Ph.D.)
- Scientific career
- Workplaces: Massachusetts Institute of Technology; University of California, Berkeley
- Thesis: Symmetry Groups, Representation Theory and Perturbations of Relativistic Universes (1969)
- Doctoral advisor: Roman Jackiw

Andrea A. diSessa (born June 3, 1947) is an education researcher and author of the book Turtle Geometry about Logo. He has also written highly cited research papers on the epistemology of physics, educational experimentation, and constructivist analysis of knowledge. He also created, with Hal Abelson, the Boxer Programming Environment at the Massachusetts Institute of Technology.

== Personal history ==
DiSessa received an A.B. in physics from Princeton University in 1969 and a Ph.D. in physics from the Massachusetts Institute of Technology in 1975. He was an invited fellow in residence at the Center for Advanced Study in the Behavioral Sciences twice, once from 1997-1998 and again from 2007-2008. He is currently Evelyn Lois Corey Professor of Education at the University of California, Berkeley and has been a member of the National Academy for Education since 1995.

Some of his notable work in Education research focuses on the concept of material intelligence and computational literacy, and ontological innovations and the role of theory in design based research.

== Material intelligence ==
Material Intelligence can be thought of as a subset of distributed cognition, where it refers to the new knowledge that furthers human intelligence and skills by interaction with the computer, and existing computer literacy, in a social environment. It can also be the ability of tools in general, and computers in specific, to increase the intelligence and skills of human mind. It was coined by Andrea DiSessa in his book Changing Minds: Computers, Learning and Literacy. He uses the terms computational literacy, material literacy, and material intelligence interchangeably. Conceptually, material intelligence is influenced by constructionism and distributed cognition theory. This concept is similar to constructionism because user makes sense of the world around them using a tool, and the interaction with this tool is helpful in shaping the understanding of the world. It is similar to distributed cognition because it focuses on "social and material setting of cognitive activity, so that culture, context and history can be linked with the core concepts of cognition."

Material intelligence has to be dependent on the material (the tool, or the computer), but it also has to be social. He says that "Material intelligence does not reside in either the mind or the materials alone. Indeed, the coupling of external and internal activity is intricate and critical". Hatch & Gardner elaborated on the social aspect of human intelligence in their chapter on Distributed Cognitions. They stated that learning is social and happens whenever humans interact with one another, even though the manner in which learning happens may differ based on 1) cultural forces, 2) local forces, and 3) personal forces, with cultural forces being the least motivating force, and personal forces being the most motivating force. This is relevant because instances of material intelligence happen at an individual level, which are shaped by personal experiences, and then they spread outwards to influence the culture.

=== Examples of material intelligence ===
A typical example of material intelligence is calculus. When Newton discovered Calculus, it was a form of material intelligence because he used the tool (literacy and scientific abilities) to further his knowledge. However, this did not create any significant effects on general human intelligence at that time, because it was a hard notion to understand. Leibniz introduced the simpler notations of Calculus, thereby making it accessible to general people, and hence, making it a permanent member of Math curricula around the world. Material intelligence can become as pervasive as traditional literacy only when all the complex social forces of innovation, adoption and interdependence support it, even if it originated with an individual or a small group of people.

In today's world, the Google search engine can be thought of as an example of material intelligence. When it was invented in 1998, it was knowledge accessible only to a few engineers and programmers, but it is now a common tool that ordinary people use to build on their intelligence or knowledge at the most basic level. From this perspective, this suggests that Google had the advantages that other search engines may not have had, as well as the complex social forces of innovation, adoption and interdependence supported it. This computer based technology is a tool that is enhancing the intelligence of general people enabling them to do more interesting things with their new knowledge.

Although tempting to think that artificial and material intelligence are similar because of their relation to computers and computational thinking, they are two very different concepts. It is distinct from Artificial Intelligence (AI) as AI places either existing human knowledge, or some enhanced version of it, into a machine; whereas material intelligence is new knowledge that furthers human intelligence and skills by interaction with the computer, and existing computer literacies, in a social environment.
