= Student Information Processing Board =

MIT student group for computing and information technology

The Student Information Processing Board (SIPB) is a student group at the Massachusetts Institute of Technology (MIT) that helps students access computing resources and use them effectively.

== History ==
SIPB was founded in 1969 by Bob Frankston, Gary Gut, David Burmaster, and Ed Fox. At the time, computers in universities were still expensive resources reserved for funded research projects. Through an arrangement with the MIT administration, SIPB administered student accounts on university-owned computers. This allowed students access to MIT's timeshared computers when computers otherwise cost millions of dollars and were as big as an entire room.

In 1983, MIT launched Project Athena, an initiative to create a distributed computing system for educational use. SIPB was instrumental in the creation of Project Athena and helped to provide MIT students with access to computing resources for independent projects. Project Athena led to several important Unix technologies such as X11, instant messaging, and network filesystems.

SIPB set up a Web server at www.mit.edu in 1993, when the number of public web servers was roughly 100 and long before university Web sites became common. When MIT finally did set up an official website, it was at web.mit.edu.

== Projects ==
SIPB has been instrumental for funding technical software projects that benefit the MIT community. These have included:

- scripts.mit.edu, a dynamic web hosting service
- MIT Minecraft, a virtual MIT campus in Minecraft
- CourseRoad, a course planning aid for MIT students
- Hydrant, a class scheduling website
- Debathena, a set of software packages for Athena clients
- XVM, a virtual machine service
- BarnOwl, an instant messaging client
- The Library Access to Music Project, a now-defunct music streaming service
