= BBC Computer Literacy Project 2012 =

- Predecessor: BBC Micro
- Successor: BBC Micro Bit
- Owner: BBC
- Website: Archived 16 February 2012 at the Wayback Machine
- Current status: Presumed Cancelled

The planned BBC Computer Literacy Project 2012, inspired by the original scheme which introduced the BBC Micro in the 1980s, was being developed by BBC Learning to provide a starting place for young people and others to develop marketable skills in computing technology and program coding.

Unlike the original project, the 2012 version didn't prescribe a particular bespoke computer device like the BBC Micro. Rather, the interactive computer-based tools where intended to be used on a variety of platforms, including Microsoft Windows, Mac OS X and Linux. Programming languages to be covered included; HTML, CSS, JavaScript, Java and Node.js. along with XML, Databases, Python, Ruby, PHP and others.

Dubbed BBC Hello World, the project had four major elements:

- Content - a series of TV and Radio programmes, plus supporting content to develop understanding of computer science, technology, and coding.
- Coding - BBC Micro 2.0, an IDE (integrated development environment) providing "the first ‘spark’" and support to learn a range of modern computer languages, applications and skills.
- Projects - designed to get young people, adults and teachers creating real products and services.
- Partnerships - The BBC will work with others who share the vision to improve understanding of computer technology and coding for all.

It appears the project was leaked ahead of time as the BBC never officially announced the Project and the website was soon taken down in 2012. No further announcements (or leaks) have been made.

== See also ==
- Digital literacy
- Computer literacy
- European Computer Driving Licence
