= Live Communications Server 2003 =

Discontinued Microsoft communications server

Microsoft Office Live Communications Server 2003 (LCS) was an enterprise real-time communications platform that provided voice, video, and instant messaging capabilities.

Microsoft Office Live Communications Server 2003 provided many capabilities that were notably absent from the company's earlier Exchange IM solution, including encryption, logging, and standards-based protocols.

Microsoft ended support for the solution on January 14, 2014. It was succeeded by Live Communications Server 2005, beginning a product lineage that eventually evolved into Microsoft Lync, Skype for Business, and Microsoft Teams.

== See also ==
- Live Communications Server 2005
