= Live Communications Server 2005 =

Discontinued Microsoft communications server

Live Communications Server 2005 (LCS 2005), codenamed Vienna, is the second version of a SIP based instant messaging and presence server after Live Communications Server 2003. LCS 2005 was first released in 2005, and was updated with new features with Service Pack 1 in 2006. LCS 2005 has been superseded by Microsoft Office Communications Server 2007.

== Overview ==
This product allows SIP clients to exchange IMs and presence using the SIMPLE protocol. The client also allows two clients to set up audio/video sessions, application sharing, and file transfer sessions.

The product was released in two editions, Standard Edition and Enterprise Edition. The Standard Edition uses a Microsoft SQL Server Desktop Engine (MSDE) (included with the product) to store configuration and user data. Enterprise Edition uses a full version of Microsoft SQL Server (purchased separately).

New features to this version compared to the 2003 release is the ability to leverage SQL and remote user access.

Presence is conveyed as levels of availability to communicate. Levels of presence support by LCS:

- Online
- Busy
- Do not disturb
- Be right back
- Away
- In a Meeting

These presence levels are controlled manually and automatically. Automatic presence changes can be triggered by the following events:

- Locking the workstation -> Away
- Screen save launches -> Away
- User does not touch keyboard or mouse for a configured time -> Away
- User is in full screen mode -> Do not disturb
- A user is busy, according to the user's calendar on the Microsoft Exchange Server -> In a meeting

== Dependencies ==
- Microsoft Active Directory
  - Storage of server configuration data
  - Authentication
    - Kerberos
    - NTLM
- PKI
  - MTLS - used for server to server connections
  - TLS - optionally used for client to server connections
- Microsoft SQL Server
  - Storage of server configuration data
  - User contact list
  - User watcher list

== Client Software ==
- Microsoft Office Communicator 2005
- Windows Messenger

== Server Roles ==
Both editions of the server software can be installed into several distinct roles:

- Home Server
- Director
- Access Proxy
- Branch Office Proxy
- Application Proxy

== Home Server ==
In Standard Edition, this server role is designed to host data for the users. The user's data is stored in an SQL database on the backend server (on Enterprise Edition) or on the Home Server (on Standard Edition). The server stores each user's list of contacts and watchers. The contact list is the list of users the end user has added to client software in order to facilitate the sending of IM's and for the monitoring the presence. The watcher list is the list of other users that have added this user to their contact list.

== Director ==
This optional server role is designed to be a kind of traffic cop when you have more than one Home Server role deployed or when you are setting up for remote users to connect to the Home Server. This server does not host any of the user's data, but knows which server each user is homed on, and can therefore redirect or proxy the request.

== Access Proxy ==
This server role is required to allow remote SIP clients to connect from the internet. This server role would be traditionally deployed in a DMZ network. The server's job would be to scan the SIP traffic and only allow communication that the server had been configured to allow to traverse to the internal network. The traffic would be sent either directly to the internal Home Server or to a Director that would send the traffic to the appropriate home server, based on the user the message was destined to.

== Branch Office Proxy ==
This role is used to aggregate connections, from a branch office clients, across a single Transport Layer Security (TLS) encrypted link, allowing many remote clients to share a single communication channel.

== Application Proxy ==
This server role is designed to allow 3rd party developers to leverage the Live Communications Server SIP stack with a custom code running on top of it. This allows 3rd parties to make a gateway server that could be used to communicate with a PBX or other internal telephony infrastructure without having to create a fully functioning SIP stack.

== Public IM Connectivity (PIC) ==
This is a feature that allows organizations to IM and share presence information between their existing base of Live Communications Server-enabled users and contacts using public IM services provided by MSN, AOL and Yahoo!. This was feature was introduced with LCS 2005 Service Pack 1 in April 2005.
