= Keith Winstein =

U.S. computer scientist and journalist

Keith Jonathan Winstein
- Education: Massachusetts Institute of Technology
- Known for: author of Mosh
- Scientific career
- Fields: computer science and journalism (professionally)
- Workplaces: MIT CSAIL; Stanford University
- Doctoral advisor: Hari Balakrishnan
- Website: cs.stanford.edu/~keithw/

Keith Jonathan Winstein (born 1981) is a U.S. computer scientist and journalist. He is currently a professor at Stanford University.

Previously, he was the Claude E. Shannon Research Assistant at the Computer Science and Artificial Intelligence Laboratory's Networks and Mobile Systems group at the Massachusetts Institute of Technology, pursuing a Ph.D. under Hari Balakrishnan. Winstein is best known as the author of Mosh, the mobile shell, a UDP-based ssh replacement optimized for mobile users featuring predictive local echo, automatic roaming, and high network resiliency.

He is the son of the late experimental physicist Bruce Winstein.

== Computer science ==
Winstein was involved in several computer science projects.

- Tyrannosaurus Lex is a system Winstein designed to hide messages in documents by altering specific words, published in 1999 while Winstein was in high school at the Illinois Mathematics and Science Academy. The system was the original work in the field of "linguistic steganography." However, analysis of Winstein's scheme by other researchers found that Tyrannosaurus Lex contains several vulnerabilities, allowing an eavesdropper to potentially decode hidden messages embedded using the system.
- Mosh, the mobile shell, first released in March 2012, is a computing tool used to connect from a client computer to a server over the Internet, to run a remote terminal. Mosh is similar to SSH, with additional features meant to improve usability for mobile users.
- qrpff is one of the shortest programs that implements the DeCSS algorithm, co-authored by Winstein and Marc Horowitz, while at MIT.
- LAMP was a project at MIT that allowed users to play CDs from a music library over the cable TV system.
- Winstein, along with Joshua Mandel, built a device for Richard Stallman that allowed him to get past the MIT proximity-card-locked doors, while allowing him to remain anonymous. The device would identify itself as Winstein, Gerald Jay Sussman, or Hal Abelson, in order to open the door.

== Journalism ==
Winstein was a news reporter for The Wall Street Journal's Boston bureau from 2005 to its closure in 2009, focusing on the biomedical beat. Prior to his stint at the Journal, he was a reporter and news editor for MIT's student newspaper, The Tech, and interned at The New York Sun.

As a reporter, Winstein wrote several articles critical of medical studies.

Winstein also disclosed errors in Google Flu Trends.
