= Project Athena =

1983 joint project by MIT, IBM and DEC

Project Athena was a joint project of MIT, Digital Equipment Corporation, and IBM to produce a campus-wide distributed computing environment for educational use. It was launched in 1983, and research and development ran until June 30, 1991. As of 2026, Athena is still in production use at MIT. It works as software (currently a set of Debian packages) that makes a machine a thin client, that will download educational applications from the MIT servers on demand.

Project Athena was important in the early history of desktop and distributed computing. It created the X Window System, Kerberos, and Zephyr Notification Service. It influenced the development of thin computing, LDAP, Active Directory, and instant messaging.

== Description ==
Leaders of the $50 million, five-year project at MIT included Michael Dertouzos, director of the Laboratory for Computer Science; Jerry Wilson, dean of the School of Engineering; and Joel Moses, head of the Electrical Engineering and Computer Science department. DEC agreed to contribute more than 300 terminals, 1600 microcomputers, 63 minicomputers, and five employees. IBM agreed to contribute 500 microcomputers, 500 workstations, software, five employees, and grant funding.

== History ==
In 1979 Dertouzos proposed to university president Jerome Wiesner that the university network opened mainframe computers for student use. At that time MIT used computers throughout its research, but undergraduates did not use computers except in Course VI (computer science) classes. With no interest from the rest of the university, the School of Engineering in 1982 approached DEC for equipment for itself. President Paul E. Gray and the MIT Corporation wanted the project to benefit the rest of the university, and IBM agreed to donate equipment to MIT except to the engineering school.

Project Athena began in May 1983. Its initial goals were to:

- Develop computer-based learning tools that are usable in multiple educational environments
- Establish a base of knowledge for future decisions about educational computing
- Create a computational environment supporting multiple hardware types
- Encourage the sharing of ideas, code, data, and experience across MIT

Wilson intended the project to extend computer power into fields of study outside computer science and engineering, such as foreign languages, economics, and political science. To implement these goals, MIT decided to build a Unix-based distributed computing system. Unlike those at Carnegie Mellon University, which also received the IBM and DEC grants, students did not have to own their own computer; MIT built computer labs for their users, although the goal was to put networked computers into each dormitory. Students were required to learn FORTRAN and Lisp, and would have access to 3M computers, capable of 1 million instructions per second and with 1 megabyte of RAM and a 1 megapixel display.

Although IBM and DEC computers were hardware-incompatible, Athena's designers intended that software would run similarly on both. MIT did not want to be dependent on one vendor at the end of Athena. Sixty-three DEC VAX-11/750 servers were the first timesharing clusters. "Phase II" began in September 1987, with hundreds of IBM RT PC workstations replacing the VAXes, which became fileservers for the workstations. The DEC-IBM division between departments no longer existed. Upon logging into a workstation, students would have immediate access to a universal set of files and programs via central services. Because the workstation used a thin client model, the user interface would be consistent despite the use of different hardware vendors for different workstations. A small staff could maintain hundreds of clients.

The project spawned many technologies that are widely used today, such as the X Window System and Kerberos. Among the other technologies developed for Project Athena were the Zephyr Notification Service and the Hesiod name and directory service.

As of November 1988 MIT had 722 workstations in 33 private and public clusters on and off campus, including student living groups and fraternities. A survey found that 92% of undergraduates had used the Athena workstations at least once, and 25% used them every day. The project received an extension of three years in January 1988. Developers who had focused on creating the operating system and courseware for various educational subjects now worked to improve Athena's stability and make it more user friendly. When Project Athena ended in June 1991, MIT's IT department took it over and extended it into the university's research and administrative divisions.

In 1993, the IBM RT PC workstations were retired, being replaced by Sun SPARCclassic, IBM RS/6000 POWERstation 220, and Personal DECstation 5000 Model 25 systems. As of April 1999 the MIT campus had more than 1300 Athena workstations, and more than 6000 Athena users logged into the system daily.

In 2006, SIPB, the student computing group at MIT, created Debathena, a set of packages of Athena software for Debian and Ubuntu. Debathena became the standard Athena release in 2009 but is no longer actively maintained. The Athena clusters around campus were permanently shuttered during the COVID-19 pandemic, although the Athena SSH dialups are still available.

== Educational computing environment ==
Athena continues in limited use as of 2026, providing a ubiquitous computing platform for education at MIT; plans are to continue its use indefinitely.

Athena was designed to minimize the use of labor in its operation, in part through the use of (what is now called ) "thin client" architecture and standard desktop configurations. This not only reduces labor content in operations but also minimizes the amount of training for deployment, software upgrade, and trouble-shooting. These features continue to be of considerable benefit today.

In keeping with its original intent, access to the Athena system has been greatly enlarged in the last several years. Whereas in 1991 much of the access was in public "clusters" (computer labs) in academic buildings, access was extended to dormitories, fraternities and sororities, and independent living groups. All dormitories had officially supported Athena clusters. In addition, most dormitories had "quick login" kiosks, which was a standup workstation with a timer to limit access to ten minutes.

Originally, the Athena release used Berkeley Software Distribution (BSD) as the base operating system for all hardware platforms. As of April 1999 public clusters consisted of Sun SPARC and SGI Indy workstations. SGI hardware was dropped in anticipation of the end of IRIX production in 2006. Linux-Athena was introduced in version 9, with the Red Hat Enterprise Linux operating system running on cheaper x86 or x86-64 hardware. Athena 9 also replaced the internally developed "DASH" menu system and Motif Window Manager (mwm) with a more modern GNOME desktop. Athena 10 is based on Ubuntu Linux (derived from Debian) only. Support for Solaris was dropped.

== Educational software ==
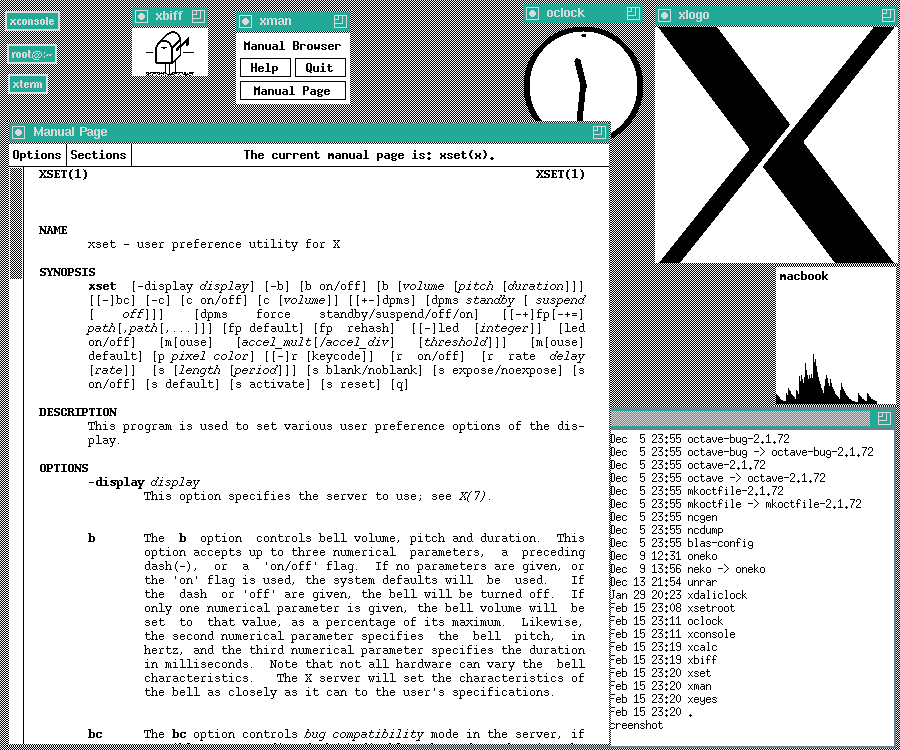
A Unix-based X Window System desktop

"I felt that, we would know Athena was successful, if we were surprised by some of the applications, it turned out that our surprises were largely in the humanities" — Joel Moses

The original concept of Project Athena was that there would be course-specific software developed to use in conjunction with teaching. Today, computers are most frequently used for "horizontal" applications such as e-mail, word processing, communications, and graphics.

The big impact of Athena on education has been the integration of third party applications into courses. Maple, and especially, MATLAB, are integrated into large numbers of science and engineering classes. Faculty expect that their students have access to, and know how to use, these applications for projects, and homework assignments, and some have used the MATLAB platform to rebuild the courseware that they had originally built using the X Window System.

More specialized third-party software are used on Athena for more discipline-specific work. Rendering software, for architecture and computer graphics classes, molecular modeling software, for chemistry, chemical engineering, and material science courses, and professional software used by chemical engineers in industry, are important components of a number of MIT classes in various departments.

== Contributions to the development of distributed systems ==
Athena was not a research project, and the development of new models of computing was not a primary objective of the project. Indeed, quite the opposite was true. MIT wanted a high-quality computing environment for education. The only apparent way to obtain one was to build it internally, using existing components where available, and augmenting those components with software to create the desired distributed system. However, the fact that this was a leading edge development in an area of intense interest to the computing industry worked strongly to the favor of MIT by attracting large amounts of funding from industrial sources.

The leading edge system architecture and design features pioneered by Athena, using current terminology, include:

- Client–server model of distributed computing using three-tier architecture (see Multitier architecture)
- Thin client (stateless) desktops
- System-wide security system (Kerberos encrypted authentication and authorization)
- Naming service (Hesiod)
- X Window System, widely used within the Unix community
- X tool kit for easy construction of human interfaces
- Instant messaging (Zephyr real time notification service)
- System-wide use of a directory system
- Integrated system-wide maintenance system (Moira Service Management System)
- On-Line Help system (OLH)
- Public bulletin board system (Discuss)

Many of the design concepts developed in the "on-line consultant" now appear in popular help desk software packages.

Because the functional and system management benefits provided by the Athena system were not available in any other system, its use extended beyond the MIT campus. In keeping with the established policy of MIT, the software was made available at no cost to all interested parties. Digital Equipment Corporation, having implemented Athena at various beta-test sites, "productized" the software as DECAthena to make it more portable, and offered it along with support services to the market. A number of academic and industrial organizations installed the Athena software. As of early 1992, 20 universities worldwide were using DECathena, with a reported 30 commercial organisations evaluating the product.

The architecture of the system also found use beyond MIT. The architecture of the Distributed Computing Environment (DCE) software from the Open Software Foundation was based on concepts pioneered by Athena. Subsequently, the Windows NT network operating system from Microsoft incorporates Kerberos and several other basic architecture design features first implemented by Athena.

== Use outside MIT ==
- Pixar Animation Studios, the computer graphics and animation company (then the Lucasfilm Computer Graphics Project, now owned by Walt Disney Pictures), used ten VAX-11/750 superminicomputers at Project Athena, for some of the rendering of The Adventures of André and Wally B.
- Iowa State University runs an implementation of Athena named "Project Vincent", named after John Vincent Atanasoff, the inventor of the Atanasoff–Berry Computer.
- North Carolina State University also runs a variation of Athena named "Eos/Unity".
- Carnegie Mellon University began a similar system a year earlier than MIT called Project Andrew which spawned AFS, Athena's current filesystem.
- University of Maryland, College Park also ran a variation of Athena on the WAM (Workstations at Maryland) and Glue, now renamed '"TerpConnect".

== See also ==
- tkWWW, a defunct web browser developed for the project by Joseph Wang
