= Turtle Geometry =

- Author: Hal Abelson and Andrea diSessa
- Subject: Turtle graphics
- Publisher: MIT Press
- Publication date: 1981
- ISBN: 0-262-51037-5
- OCLC: 15162396

Turtle Geometry is a college-level math text written by Hal Abelson and Andrea diSessa which aims to engage students in exploring mathematical properties visually via a simple programming language to maneuver the icon of a turtle trailing lines across a personal computer display.

== See also ==
- Turtle graphics
- Turtle Geometry at MIT Press
