= Bob Frankston =

American software engineer and businessman

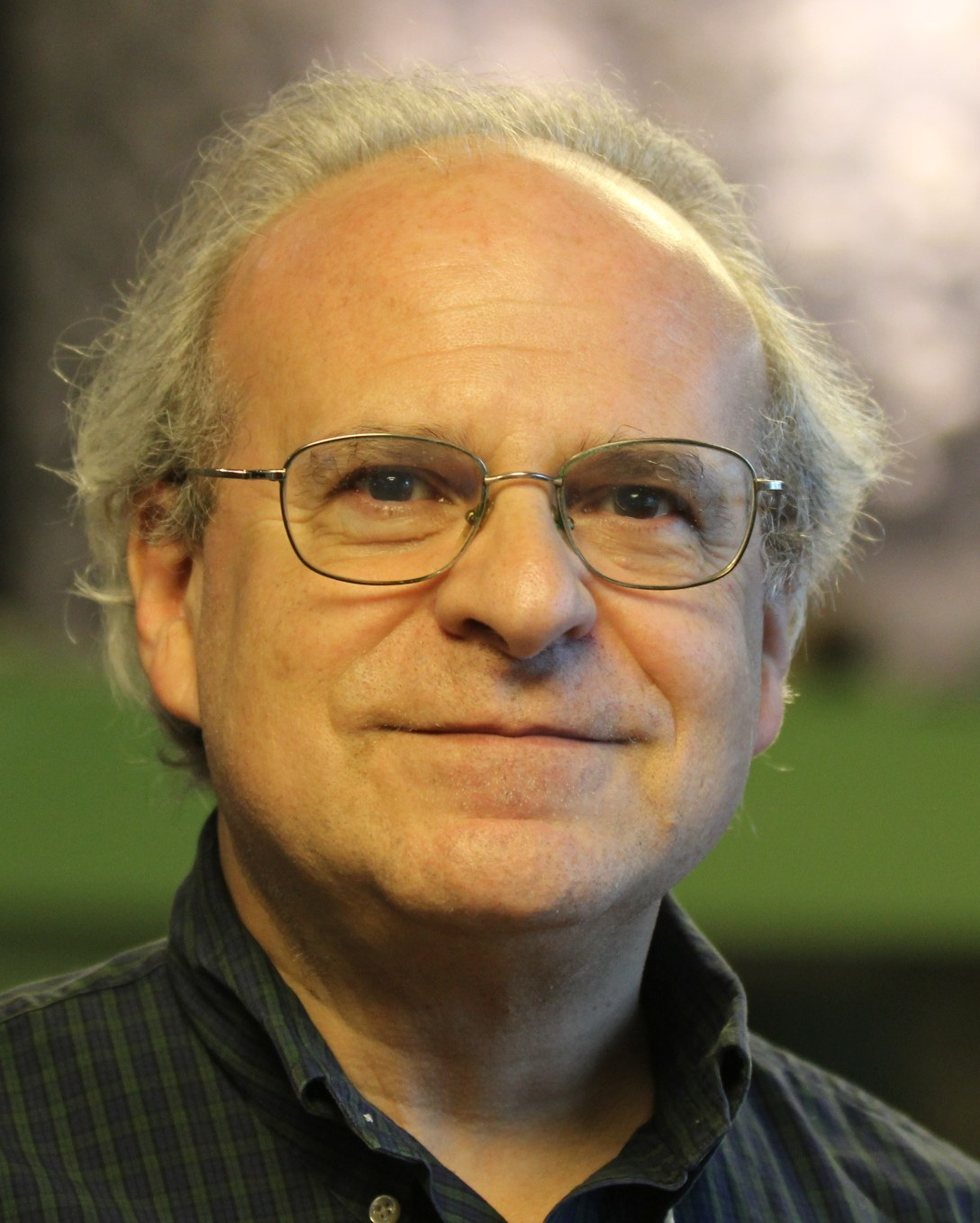
- Born: June 14, 1949 (age 77); Brooklyn, New York, U.S.
- Education: Massachusetts Institute of Technology (SB, MEng)
- Known for: Co-creator of VisiCalc

Robert M. Frankston (born June 14, 1949) is an American software engineer and businessman who co-created, with Dan Bricklin, the company Software Arts and the spreadsheet program VisiCalc, the latter being vended by VisiCorp.

== Early life and education ==
Frankston was born and raised in Brooklyn, New York. He graduated from Stuyvesant High School in New York City in 1966. He earned a S.B. degree in computer science and mathematics from the Massachusetts Institute of Technology, followed by a Master of Engineering degree in computer science, also from MIT.

== Career ==
After his work with Dan Bricklin, Frankston later worked for Lotus Development Corporation and Microsoft.

Frankston became an advocate for reducing the role of telecommunications companies in the evolution of the Internet, particularly with respect to broadband and mobile communications. He invented the term "Regulatorium" to describe what he considers collusion between telecommunication companies and their regulators that prevents change.

Frankston's early career and projects are described in the book Programmers at Work, a collection of interviews published by Microsoft Press.

== Awards and recognition ==
- Fellow of the Association for Computing Machinery (1994) "for the invention of VisiCalc, a new metaphor for data manipulation that galvanized the personal computing industry".
- MIT William L. Stewart Award for co-founding the M.I.T. Student Information Processing Board (SIPB).
- The Association for Computing Machinery Software System Award (1985).
- The MIT LCS Industrial Achievement Award.
- The Washington Award (2001) from the Western Society of Engineers (with Dan Bricklin).
- In 2004, he was made a Fellow of the Computer History Museum "for advancing the utility of personal computers by developing the VisiCalc electronic spreadsheet".
