= Meatspace Chat =

Instant messaging software

- Developer: Jen Fong-Adwent
- Initial release: May 12, 2013
- Written in: Node.js, HTML5
- Operating system: Windows, macOS, Android, iOS
- Type: Instant messaging client

Meatspace Chat is a web-based online chat system created by Edna Piranha where users submit 250 character messages, combined with instantly created animated GIFs of themselves taken by a webcam.

== Overview ==
Meatspace differentiates itself from other chat systems by eschewing usernames, user registration and chat channels. Instead, Meatspace embraces ephemerality by limiting the exposure of a single message to a limited number of minutes; after the time elapses, the message does not appear again. Ephemeral content is an increasingly important form of Internet communication because it allows people to communicate spontaneously, without concern for whether that communication will be recorded. This is the idea of the "Forever Internet" versus the "Erasible Internet". The Erasible Internet allows for all the interactivity, but also allows users to control and erase their content.

== Technology ==
Meatspace uses HTML5 technologies such as WebRTC for its capture of user videos and an animated GIF library by Sole Penadés for its client, and Node.js for its server.

Meatspace is open-source, available in a number of versions that use different database backends. There are also a number of third-party interfaces to Meatspace for providing mobile versions for Android and iOS; there is also a bot that responds to commands.

People can host their own meatspace chat server, or use one of a number of public servers. There is a public server at chat.meatspac.es, which is used by Web Developers such as Paul Irish and Tom Dale. Writer and Internet technology professor Clay Shirky has stated that Meatspace Chat "feels like Old Internet, Weird in a good way, good in a weird way".
