= Zephyr (protocol) =

Computer network protocol

Created at the Massachusetts Institute of Technology as part of Project Athena, Zephyr was designed as an instant messaging protocol and application-suite with a heavy Unix background. Using the "do one thing, do it well" philosophy of Unix, it was made up of several separate programs working together to make a complete messaging system. Zephyr and IRC were the first widely used IP-based instant-messaging systems.

== Creation ==
Zephyr is the invention of Ciarán Anthony DellaFera who was, at that time, an employee of Digital Equipment Corporation and a Visiting Research Scientist at Project Athena. The design originated as a solution to the "reverse Remote Procedure Call (RPC)" problem: how can service providers (servers in a client–server system) locate and communicate with service users. The initial concept emerged from conversations between Ciarán and Michael R. Gretzinger, another systems engineer at Project Athena, in early 1986. By mid to late 1986 Ciarán had distilled the problem to two specific issues: the ability to locate users in a distributed computing environment (known today as "presence detection"), and the ability to deliver scalable, light-weight, and authentic messages in a distributed computing environment. The Zephyr Development Team (Mark W. Eichin, Robert S. French, David C. Jedlinsky, John T. Kohl, William E. Sommerfeld) was responsible for the creation of the initial code-base and the subsequent releases that were issued throughout the late 1980s.

== Application ==
Zephyr is still in use today at a few university environments such as Carnegie Mellon, Iowa State, University of Maryland, College Park, Brown University and MIT. At MIT, it was largely replaced by modern and more popular instant messenger systems such as XMPP. However, in 2020, MIT replaced their XMPP server with Slack, but the Zephyr server is still kept alive by a small community of enthusiasts.

== Points of interest ==
Zephyr uses UDP datagrams sent between ports 2102, 2103, and 2104. It is incompatible with most routers doing NAT because it reports the internal IP address and so returning datagrams are incorrectly routed. Most sites have deployed Zephyr using Kerberos 4 authentication exclusively, though in late 2007, some sites, including Iowa State, deployed Zephyr using Kerberos 5.

== Client support ==
- BarnOwl has always had Zephyr protocol support.
- Pidgin supports the Zephyr protocol since version 0.11.0-pre10 (April 13, 2001).
- Adium added support for Zephyr in Version 0.70 (October 18, 2004), but dropped in version 1.4b6 (June 3, 2009).

== See also ==
- Comparison of instant messaging clients
