= Library Access to Music Project =

Free music library for MIT students

- Owners: MIT's Student Information Processing Board and Cable Television groups
- Creators: Keith Winstein, Joshua Mandel, and others
- Website: lamp.mit.edu
- Commercial: no
- Launched: October 27, 2003; 22 years ago
- Current status: Ended on October 16, 2016; 9 years ago
- Content license: Server software GPLv2 (or, at your option, any later version); music is not generally licensed for redistribution
- Written in: Perl, PHP, C++

The Library Access to Music Project (LAMP) was a free music library for MIT students started by Keith Winstein and Joshua Mandel, and funded by the MIT/Microsoft iCampus alliance. Originally launched on October 27, 2003, it was in continuous operation between October 25, 2004 and October 16, 2016.

== Using LAMP ==
A student wishing to use LAMP goes to the LAMP website, and selects several songs. LAMP assigns to the student a channel on MIT Cable (e.g. Channel 63), then begins playing the selected music on that channel for anyone to listen to.

== Legal Significance ==
One key advantage of LAMP, in addition to its being free for its users, is the fact that any piece of music is in theory available on it because copyright law is more lax about broadcasting over analog transmissions, such as MIT Cable, than it is about digital transmissions such as those made over computer networks. For example, a person wanting to transmit a copy of "... Baby One More Time", written by Max Martin and performed by Britney Spears, could do it either with an analog transmission or a digital transmission. Using an analog transmission would only require permission from BMG, the publisher, whereas use of a digital transmission would require Spears's permission as well.

This aspect of copyright law is problematic for those wishing to transmit songs by artists such as The Beatles. Their label, Apple Corps, as well as others, typically do not allow digital transmissions of their music, which is why their songs were not available on online music stores such as iTunes until late 2010. However, songs by The Beatles are available on LAMP, since LAMP doesn't require Apple Corps's permission.

Initially, MIT purchased audio from LoudEye, Inc., in MP3 form. However, on the day of LAMP's initial launch, Universal Music Group approached Loudeye with concerns that it lacked the necessary licenses to make the MP3s that were sold to MIT. Without music, LAMP was forced to go on a hiatus of about one year, until a different method of obtaining music was devised.

LAMP in its current incarnation requires someone to purchase a physical CD and place it in a CD jukebox, where it is then turned into an MP3. However, ripping MP3s of individual songs at will is still legally questionable, so LAMP takes advantage of the "ephemeral recording" provision of copyright law. Under this provision, consumers can create a "transmission program" so long as it is designed to be played back as a whole, in sequence. LAMP currently uses "transmission programs" that are approximately 30 minutes in length.

== Technical information ==
LAMP is appropriately built with LAMP technologies, namely Linux, Apache, MySQL, and Perl and PHP. Portions of the software are also written in C++.

== See also ==
- All About Jazz
