= Computational thinking =

Set of problem-solving methods

Computational thinking (CT) refers to the thought processes involved in formulating problems so their solutions can be represented as computational steps and algorithms. In education, computational thinking is a set of problem-solving methods that involve expressing problems and their solutions in ways a computer could also execute. It involves automation of processes, but also using computing to explore, analyze, and understand processes (natural and artificial).

== History ==
The history of computational thinking as a concept dates back at least to the 1950s, but most ideas are much older. CT involves ideas like abstraction, data representation, and logically organizing data, which are also prevalent in other kinds of thinking, such as scientific thinking, engineering thinking, systems thinking, design thinking, model-based thinking, and the like. Neither the idea nor the term are recent: Preceded by terms like algorithmizing, procedural thinking, algorithmic thinking, and computational literacy by computing pioneers like Alan Perlis and Donald Knuth, the term computational thinking was first used by Seymour Papert in 1980 and again in 1996. Computational thinking can be used to algorithmically solve complicated problems of scale, and is often used to realize large improvements in efficiency.

The phrase computational thinking was brought to the forefront of the computer science education community in 2006, as a result of a Communications of the ACM essay on the subject by Jeannette Wing. The essay suggests that thinking computationally is a fundamental skill for everyone, not just computer scientists, and argues for the importance of integrating computational ideas into other subjects in schools. The essay also states that by learning computational thinking, children will do better in many everyday tasks; as examples, the essay gives packing one's backpack, finding one's lost mittens, and in adulthood, knowing when to stop renting and buy instead. The continuum of computational thinking questions in education ranges from K–9 computing for children to professional and continuing education, where the challenge is how to communicate deep principles, maxims, and ways of thinking between experts.

For the first 10 years, computational thinking was a United States-centered movement, and that early focus is still seen in the field's research. The field's most cited articles and most cited people were active in the early US CT wave, and the field's most active researcher networks are US-based. Dominated by US and European researchers, it is unclear to what extent the field's predominantly Western body of research literature can cater to the needs of students in other cultural groups. An ongoing effort to globalize effective thinking skills in everyday life is emerging in the Prolog community, whose Prolog Education Committee, sponsored by the Association for Logic Programming, has the mission of "making Computational and Logical Thinking through Prolog and its successors a core subject in educational curricula and beyond, worldwide".

== Characteristics ==
The characteristics that define computational thinking are decomposition, pattern recognition/data representation, generalization/abstraction, and algorithms. By decomposing a problem, identifying the variables involved using data representation, and creating algorithms, a generic solution can be found. The generic solution is a generalization or abstraction that can be used to solve a multitude of variations of the initial problem.

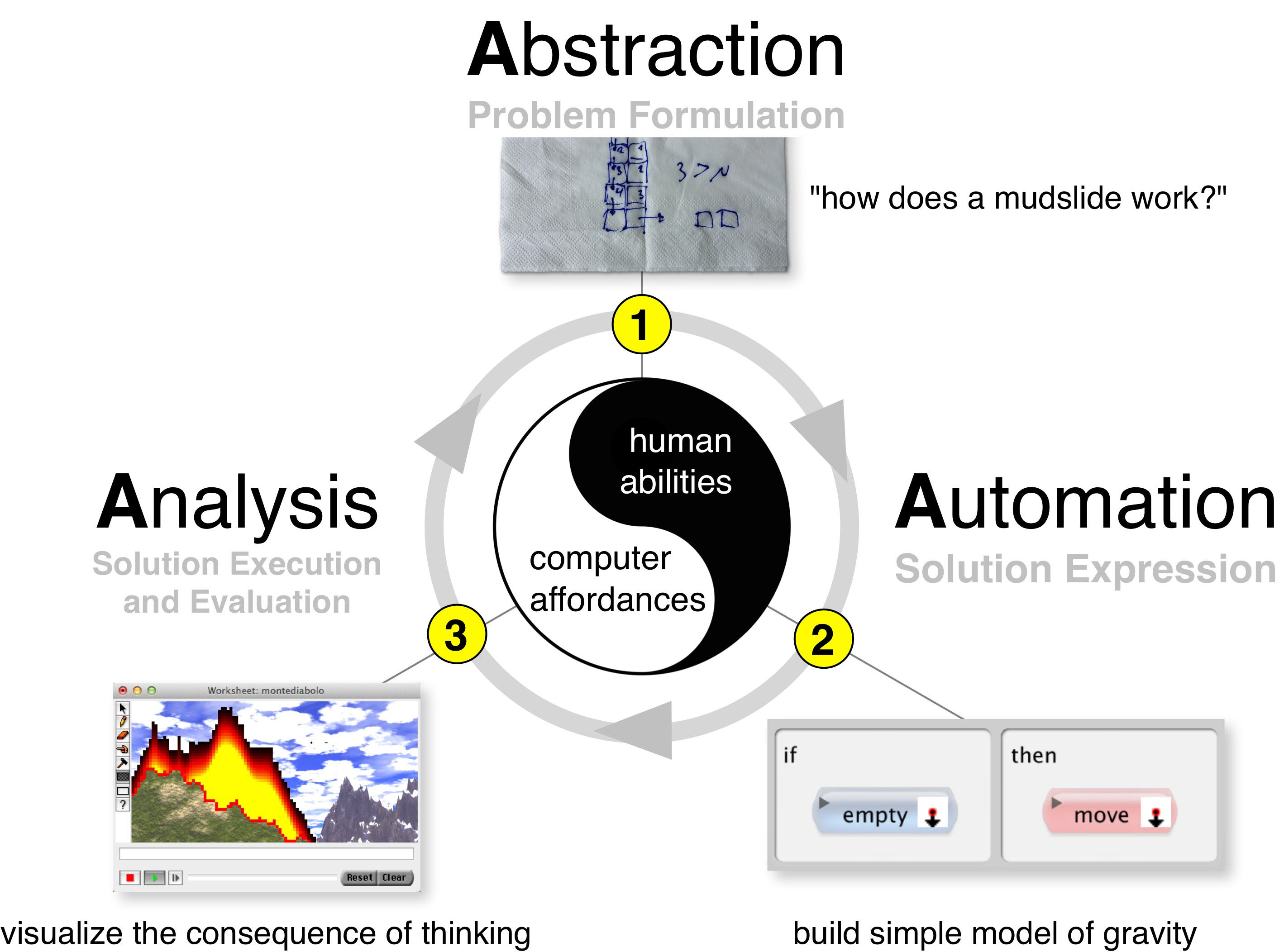
The "three As" Computational Thinking Process describes computational thinking as a set of three steps: abstraction, automation, and analysis.

Another characterization of computational thinking is the "three As" iterative process based on three stages:

1. Abstraction: Problem formulation;
2. Automation: Solution expression;
3. Analysis: Solution execution and evaluation.

=== Connection to the "four Cs" ===
The four Cs of 21st-century learning are communication, critical thinking, collaboration, and creativity. The fifth C could be computational thinking which entails the capability to resolve problems algorithmically and logically. It includes tools that produce models and visualize data. Learning scientist Shuchi Grover describes how computational thinking is applicable across subjects beyond science, technology, engineering, and mathematics (STEM) which include the social sciences and language arts.

Since its inception, the four Cs have gradually gained acceptance as important elements of many school syllabi. This development triggered modifications in platforms and directions such as inquiry, project-based, and more profound learning across all K–12 levels. Many countries have introduced computational thinking to all students: The United Kingdom has had CT in its national curriculum since 2012. Singapore calls CT "national capability". Other nations like Australia, China, Korea, and New Zealand have embarked on massive efforts to introduce computational thinking in schools. In the US, President Barack Obama created the "Computer Science for All" program to empower a new generation of students in America with the proper computer science proficiency required to flourish in a digital economy. Computational thinking means thinking or solving problems like computer scientists. CT refers to thought processes required in understanding problems and formulating solutions. CT involves logic, assessment, patterns, automation, and generalization. Career readiness can be integrated into academic environments in multiple ways.

The "algoRithms" part of CT has also been referred to as the "fourth R", where the others are Reading, wRiting, and aRithmetic.

== Computational education ==
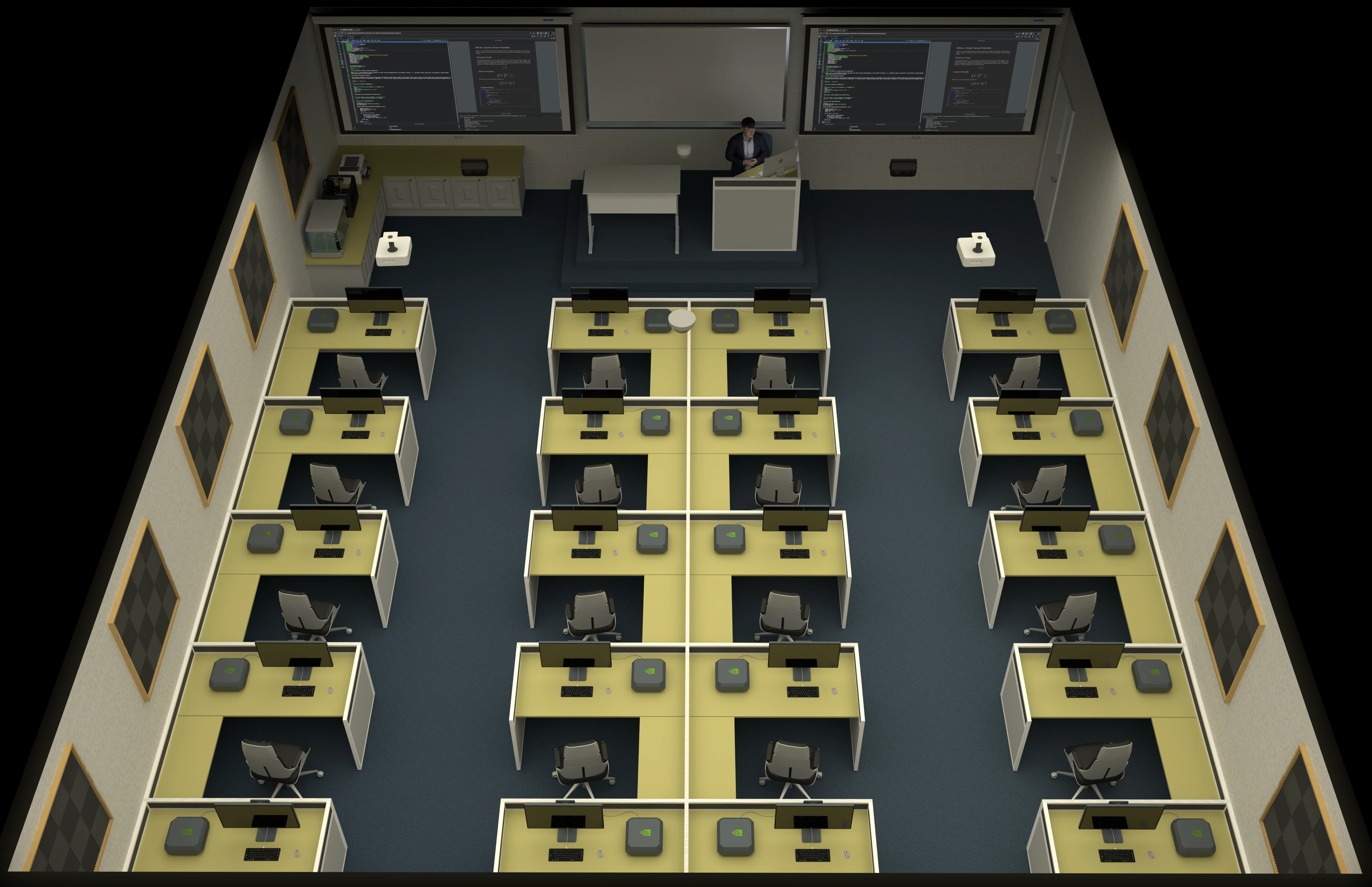
3D design of cubicle desks to get computers to the desk for a computational education

- Computational archaeology
- Computational architecture
- Computational art
- Computational biology
- Computational chemistry
- Computational complexity theory
- Computational creativity
- Computational data science
- Computational design
- Computational economics
- Computational electromagnetics
- Computational engineering
- Computational epigenetics
- Computational finance
- Computational fluid dynamics
- Computational forensics
- Computational genomics
- Computational geometry
- Computational geophysics
- Computational healthcare
- Computational imaging
- Computational intelligence
- Computational law
- Computational learning theory

- Computational linguistics
- Computational logic
- Computational manufacturing
- Computational materials science
- Computational mathematics
- Computational mechanics
- Computational medicine
- Computational molecular dynamics
- Computational musicology
- Computational neuroscience
- Computational number theory
- Computational particle physics
- Computational pathology
- Computational photography
- Computational physics
- Computational psychiatry
- Computational science
- Computational scientist
- Computational simulations
- Computational sociology
- Computational statistics
- Computational sustainability
- Computational thermodynamics
- Computational toxicology
- Computational writing

== In K–12 education ==
Similar to scientists Seymour Papert, Alan Perlis, and Marvin Minsky before, Jeannette Wing envisioned computational thinking becoming an essential part of every child's education. However, integrating CT into the K–12 curriculum and computer science education has faced several challenges, including agreement on the definition of computational thinking, how to assess children's development in it, and how to distinguish it from other similar "thinking" like systems thinking, design thinking, and engineering thinking. Currently, CT is broadly defined as a set of cognitive skills and problem-solving processes that include (but are not limited to) the following characteristics (but there are arguments that few, if any, of them belong to computing specifically, instead of being principles in many fields of science and engineering):

- Using abstractions and pattern recognition to represent a problem in new and different ways
- Organizing and analyzing data logically
- Breaking a problem down into smaller parts
- Approaching a problem using programmatic thinking techniques such as iteration, symbolic representation, and logical operations
- Reformulating a problem into a series of ordered steps (algorithmic thinking)
- Identifying, analyzing, and implementing possible solutions with the goal of achieving the most efficient and effective combination of steps and resources
- Generalizing this problem-solving process to a wide variety of problems

Current integration of computational thinking into the K–12 curriculum comes in two forms: in computer science classes directly or through the use and measure of CT techniques in other subjects. Teachers in Science, Technology, Engineering, and Mathematics (STEM)-focused classrooms that include CT allow students to practice problem-solving skills such as trial and error. Valerie Barr and Chris Stephenson describe CT patterns across disciplines in a 2011 ACM Inroads article. However, Conrad Wolfram has argued that CT should be taught as a distinct subject.

There are online institutions that provide a curriculum, and other related resources, to build and strengthen pre-college students with computational thinking, analysis, and problem-solving.

== Center for Computational Thinking ==
Carnegie Mellon University in Pittsburgh has a Center for Computational Thinking. The Center's major activity is conducting PROBEs or PROBlem-oriented Explorations. These PROBEs are experiments that apply novel computing concepts to problems to show the value of CT. A PROBE experiment is generally a collaboration between a computer scientist and an expert in the field to be studied. The experiment typically runs for a year. In general, a PROBE will seek to find a solution for a broadly applicable problem and avoid narrowly focused issues. Some examples of PROBE experiments are optimal kidney transplant logistics and how to create drugs that do not breed drug-resistant viruses.

Similarly, Duke University in Durham, North Carolina, has a Center for Computational Thinking (CCT), and the Illinois Institute of Technology (Illinois Tech) in Chicago has an Active Computational Thinking (ACT) Center.

== Criticism ==
The concept of computational thinking has been criticized as too vague, as it's rarely made clear how it is different from other forms of thought. The inclination among computer scientists to force computational solutions upon other fields has been called "computational chauvinism". Some computer scientists worry about the promotion of CT as a substitute for a broader computer science education, as CT represents just one small part of the field. Others worry that the emphasis on CT encourages computer scientists to think too narrowly about the problems they can solve, thus avoiding the social, ethical, and environmental implications of the technology they create. In addition, as nearly all CT research is done in the US and Europe, it is not certain how well those educational ideas work in other cultural contexts.

A 2019 paper argues that the term "computational thinking" (CT) should be used mainly as a shorthand to convey the educational value of computer science, hence the need of teaching it in school. The strategic goal is to have computer science recognized in school as an autonomous scientific subject more than trying to identify "body of knowledge" or "assessment methods" for CT. Particularly important is to stress the fact that the scientific novelty associated with CT is the shift from the "problem solving" of mathematics to the "having problem solved" of computer science. Without the "effective agent", who automatically executes the instructions received to solve the problem, there would be no computer science, just mathematics. Another criticism in the same paper is that focusing on "problem solving" is too narrow, since "solving a problem is just an instance of a situation where one wants to reach a specified goal". The paper therefore generalizes the original definitions by Cuny, Snyder, and Wing and Aho as follows: "Computational thinking is the thought processes involved in modeling a situation and specifying the ways an information-processing agent can effectively operate within it to reach an externally specified (set of) goal(s)."

Many definitions of CT describe it only at skill level because the momentum behind its growth comes from its promise to boost STEM education. Also, the latest movement in STEM education is based on suggestions (by learning theories) that students be taught experts' habits of mind. So whether it is computational thinking, scientific thinking, or engineering thinking, the motivation and the challenge is the same: teaching experts' habits of mind to novices is inherently problematic because of the prerequisite content knowledge and practice skills needed to engage them in the same thinking processes as experts. Only when the experts' habits of mind are linked to fundamental cognitive processes can their skill-sets be narrowed down to more basic competencies that can be taught to novices. There have been only a few studies that address the cognitive essence of CT. Among those, Yasar (Communications of ACM, Vol. 61, No. 7, July 2018) describes CT as thinking that is generated/facilitated by a computational device, be it biological or electronic. Accordingly, everyone employs CT, not just computer scientists, and it can be improved via education and experience.

== Computational logic and human thinking ==
Computational logic is an approach to computing that includes both computational thinking and logical thinking. It is based on a view of computing as the application of general-purpose logical reasoning to domain-specific knowledge expressed in logical terms.

Teaching materials for computational logic as a computer language for children were developed in the early 1980s. University-level texts for non-computing students were developed in the early 2010s. In the 2020s, a variety of new teaching materials have been developed to bridge the gap between STEM and non-STEM academic disciplines.

== See also ==
- Computer-based math
- Artificial Intelligence
- Decision making
- Education
- Machine learning
- Data Science
- Data thinking
- Computational literacy
- List of educational software
- List of online educational resources
- Logic programming
