= Computational literacy =

Computational literacy is a term that is used to describe the broad ability to apply computational thinking and awareness of the range, scope and limitations of computational techniques. It is distinct from the ability to perform math calculations by hand, instead anticipating that the actual computations will be performed by computers.

A leading advocate of Computational literacy, Conrad Wolfram explains the difference as "The maths taught around the world today does not fit how it is used in the real world. Computation technology is more accessible than ever before, but no curriculum in the world assumes it exists. Instead, it is focussed on the mechanics of hand calculation, rather than the essence of real-world maths." Andrea diSessa has stated that "computers might fundamentally change learning".

== Impact ==
Wolfram has argued that "to achieve stable societies, because enfranchisement requires a good level of computational literacy" and has argued for the introduction of computational literacy qualifications. Sharin Jacob of the University of California says that "Today's students will enter a workforce that is powerfully shaped by computing. To be successful in a changing economy, students must learn to think algorithmically and computationally".

Projects at the Educational Development Center have shown success developing computational literacy at pre-school level.

Researchers in this subject, Daniel Braun and Johannes Huwer, argue that computational literacy is a skill that is growing in importance within classrooms. They state that teachers should be proficient themselves and that such expertise is crucial to how the science, technology, engineering, and mathematics (STEM) disciplines are taught to students. They argue that as a result of this, expertise in the realms of computer science and mathematics should be given higher priority with regard to how the natural sciences are taught. They claim that "although computer science competencies play a crucial role in many aspects of scientific problems, they are still far from being integrated into education as they should be in the 21st century."

== See also ==
- Computational thinking
- Literacy
