= Tigase =

- Developer: Artur Hefczyc
- Initial release: October 2004
- Stable release: 8.4.1 / 17 April 2026
- Written in: Java
- Operating system: Cross-platform
- Platform: Java
- Type: XMPP server
- License: AGPL-3.0-only
- Website: tigase.net
- Repository: GitHub

Tigase is an open source (GNU AGPL-3.0-only) project started by Artur Hefczyc in October 2004 to develop an XMPP server implementation in Java.

Initially the goal was to develop a fully compliant XMPP server with backward compatibility with an informal XMPP specification. In time the project has been split into smaller parts – server implementation, XML tools containing a parser for XML streams and a test suite with a built-in scripting language. In summer 2006, the client-side library and application in Java have joined the Tigase project. In November 2013, Tigase added a REST API layer project, and later HTTP tools - AdminUI.

In 2018 IoT1 cloud was launched - bringing all XMPP and all Tigase software together to facilitate IoT devices communication.

Tigase is currently in active development - on 19 December 2022 Tigase XMPP Server 8.3.0 was released.

== Subprojects ==
Now Tigase consists of following subprojects:

=== Server ===
Server-side related projects

- Tigase XMPP Server – main XMPP server implementation
- Tigase XMLTools – XML tools, parser simple XML database
- Tigase Utils – Repository with common files used in other Tigase subprojects
- Tigase TestSuite – suite of functional tests for XMPP servers
- Tigase XMPP Server Command Line Management Tool – Command Line Management Tool
- Tigase MUC - component allowing creating group chatrooms
- Tigase PubSub - implementation of XEP-0060: Publish-Subscribe extension
- Tigase Message Archiving - Component for the Tigase XMPP Server as the server component, implementing XEP-0136: Message Archiving
- Tigase Socks5 Proxy - XEP-0065: SOCKS5 Bytestreams implementation for the Tigase XMPP Server component allowing file transfer between clients
- Tigase STUN - implementation of STUN protocol
- Tigase HTTP API - HTTP component providing REST API, web-based installer and AdminUI.

=== Client ===
- Tigase JaXMPP – XMPP client library
- Tigase Swift XMPP client library - XMPP library written in Swift
- StorkIM – Android XMPP client
- BeagleIM - macOS XMPP client
- SiskinIM - iOS XMPP client

== See also ==
- Extensible Messaging and Presence Protocol
