= Ericsson-LG =

Joint venture company

- Type: Joint venture
- Founded: 2010
- Headquarters: Headquarters: Seoul, South Korea 13F, Meritz Tower, Gangnam-gu Ericsson-LG, Seoul R&D Campus 12-13F, LG Gasan Digital Center, Geumcheon-gu
- Key people: Hannes Ekström, Haengman Heo
- Owner: Ericsson (75%) and LG Electronics (25%)
- Number of employees: 850 in South Korea
- Website: www.ericssonlg.com

Ericsson-LG is a joint venture company owned by the Swedish group Ericsson (75%) and the South Korean group LG Electronics (25%). Founded in July 2010, Ericsson-LG designs and markets devices for telecommunications network operators and enterprises in South Korea.

Ericsson-LG has worked closely with three major service operators in South Korea: SKT, KT, and LG U+. As a core partner, Ericsson-LG has enabled operators to launch early commercialized services, namely CDMA and 5G, as well as play an important role in driving Korea as a key player in the global mobile communications market.

In October 2022, Ericsson-LG appointed Hannes Ekström as the CEO and Joint Representative Director.

Initially founded as LG-Nortel in November 2005, Ericsson bought Nortel's stake in June 2010 and subsequently renamed the company LG-Ericsson. On March 22, 2012, Ericsson increased its stake to 75% and on September 1, 2012, LG-Ericsson changed its name to Ericsson-LG.

== Key Products and Services ==
Ericsson-LG’s key products and services has three primary business units: Networks, Cloud Software and Services, and Private Networks.

First, Networks provides the hardware, software, and related offerings for both radio access network (RAN) and mobile transport. The network technology covers Ericsson-LG’s end-to-end 5G platform and enables access to a full 5G deployment.

Second, Cloud Software and Services. This business unit includes solutions to core network and automation (new use cases with 5G that were previously not possible with 3G or 4G networks) and managed services, which advances network and IT operations as well as next-generation connectivity. Furthermore, for better service quality and successful 5G monetization, Ericsson-LG also offers solutions for services orchestration and telecom BSS. These solutions allow service providers to smoothly transition to cloud native software and automated operations.

Finally, there is private networks. Ericsson-LG offers private network solution, Ericsson Private 5G, for various industries to fit any organization’s digital transformation.
