= Wolfram (name) =

Wolfram is both a given name and surname of Germanic origin. It is composed as wolf ‘wolf’ + hrafn ‘raven’, important in Germanic mythology.

== Given name ==
- Wulfram of Sens (c. 640–703), Merovingian saint
- Wolfram von Eschenbach (1170–1220), German writer
- Wolfram von Richthofen (1895–1945), German field marshal general of the Luftwaffe during World War II
- Wolfram Bode (1942–2025), German biochemist
- Wolfram Eckert (born 1983), Austrian disc jockey
- Wolfram Saenger (1939–2026), German biochemist and crystallographer
- Wolfram Setz (1941–2023), German historian, editor, translator, and essayist
- Wolfram Sievers (1905–1948), German Holocaust perpetrator and manager of the Ahnenerbe, executed for war crimes
- Wolfram Waibel Jr. (born 1970), Austrian sport shooter
- Wolfram Waibel Sr. (1947–2023), Austrian sport shooter
- Wolfram Weimer (born 1964), German publisher and journalist, German Federal Government Commissioner for Culture and the Media (since 2025)
- Wolfram Wuttke (1961–2015), German footballer

== Surname ==
- Conrad Wolfram (born 1970), British technologist and businessman, brother of Stephen Wolfram
- Donald Justin Wolfram (1919–2003), American religious leader
- Gary L. Wolfram, American economist
- Grant Wolfram (born 1996), American baseball player
- Herwig Wolfram (born 1934), Austrian historian
- Hugo Wolfram (1925–2015), an English businessman and novelist
- Joy Wolfram (born 1989), Finnish nanoscientist
- Joseph Maria Wolfram (1789–1839), Bohemian composer and politician
- Karol Wolfram (1899–1965), Polish evangelical priest and educator
- Maria Wolfram (born 1961), Finnish visual artist
- Martin Wolfram (born 1992), German diver
- Ralf-Reimar Wolfram (1912–1945), German sailor
- Stephen Wolfram (born 1959), British-American computer scientist and entrepreneur
- Sybil Wolfram (1931–1993), a philosopher, mother of Stephen
- Walt Wolfram (born 1941), American sociolinguist and former president of the Linguistic Society of America

== Fictional ==
- Wolfram von Bielefeld, a character in Kyo Kara Maoh!, a series of light novels
- Wolfram, a character in the film My Hero Academia: Two Heroes

== See also ==
- Wolfram & Hart, a fictional law firm in the 1999 television series Angel
