= Kate Friedlander =

Kate Friedlander (born Käte Frankl; also Käte Misch-Frankl or Kate Friedländer-Frankl; 1902–1949) was a psychoanalyst, who left Germany for England in 1933, and became a member of the British Psychoanalytical Society.

== Training and contributions ==
Analysed by Hanns Sachs, Friedlander placed herself squarely in the tradition of psychoanalysis represented by Anna Freud, and encouraged her in establishing the Hampstead Clinic for child therapy, as well as working herself in parallel outreach institutions.

Among her theoretical contributions were an exploration of libidinal elements in the wish to die - the Death drive - and an examination of female masochism through the figure of Charlotte Brontë. She also wrote on the link between crime, and defects in the development of ego/superego.

== Family ==
She was the mother of philosopher Sybil Wolfram (born Sybille Misch). The scientist and entrepreneur Stephen Wolfram and technologist Conrad Wolfram are her grandchildren.

== Selected writings ==
- 'On the Longing to Die', International Journal of Psycho-Analysis XXI (1940)
- 'Children's Books and their Function in Latency and Puberty' American Imago III (1942)
- The Psycho-Analytic Approach to Juvenile Delinquency (1947)

== See also ==
- Annie Reich
- August Aichhorn
- Controversial discussions
- Oceanic feeling
- Otto Fenichel
- Paula Heimann
- Wilhelm Reich
