= Metallic fiber =

Thread wholly or partly made from metal

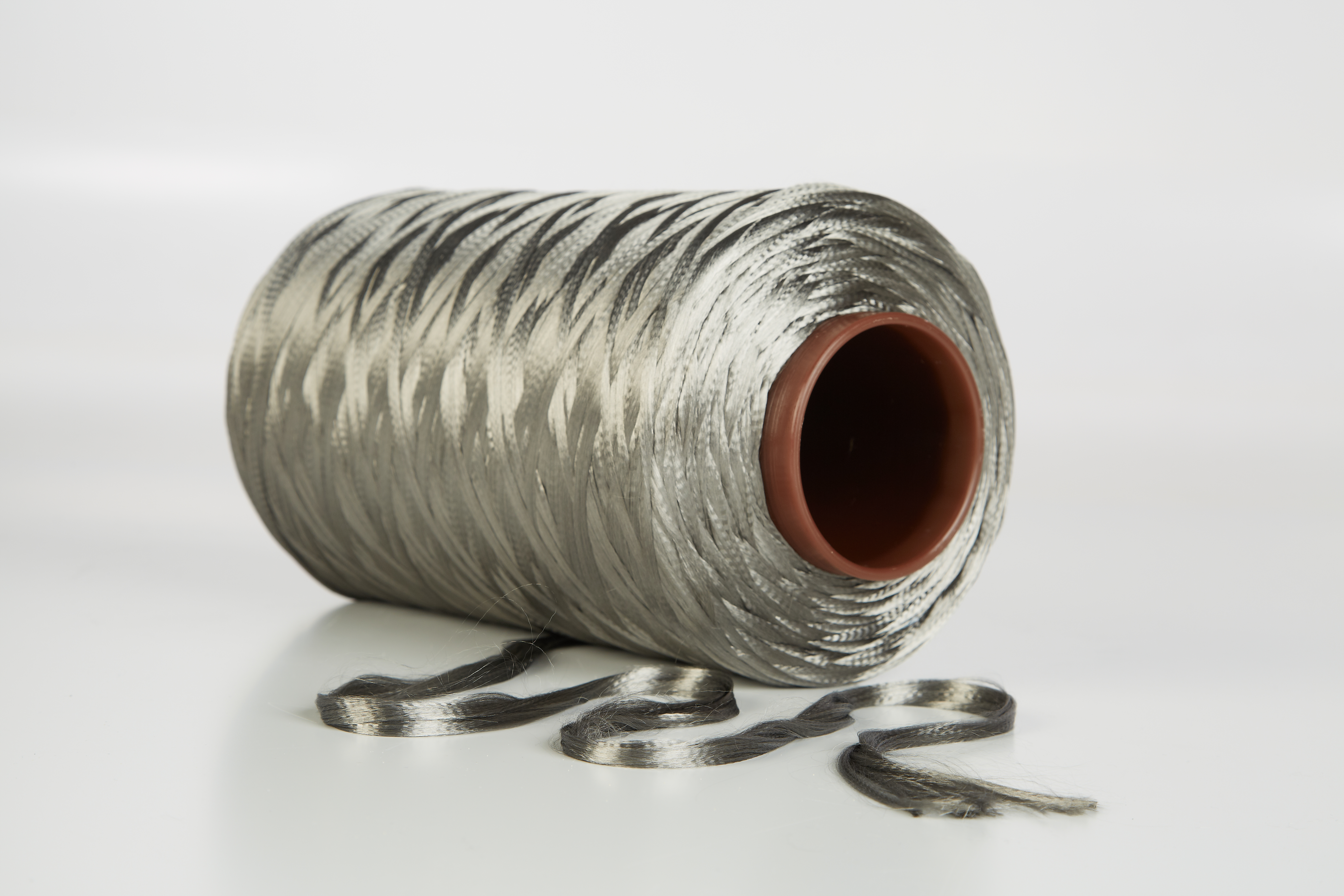
Bundle drawn, stainless steel fiber

Metallic fibers are manufactured fibers composed of metal, metallic alloys, plastic-coated metal, metal-coated plastic, or a core completely covered by metal.

Having their origin in textile and clothing applications, gold and silver fibers have been used since ancient times as yarns for fabric decoration. More recently, aluminium yarns, aluminized plastic yarns, and aluminized nylon yarns have replaced gold and silver.

Today's metal fiber industry mainly offers fibers in stainless steel, nickel, titanium, copper and aluminium for various applications. Metallic filaments can be coated with transparent films to minimize tarnishing.

Many methods exist to manufacture metallic fibers, and each comes with its own benefits and limitations. The most common methods include shaving from a larger stock, casting directly from molten metal, and growing around a seed. Multiple fibers can also be woven or intertwined to form larger strands.

== History ==
Gold and silver have been used since ancient times as decoration in the clothing and textiles of kings, leaders, nobility and other high status people. Many of these elegant textiles can be found in museums around the world. Historically, the metallic thread was constructed by wrapping a metal strip around a fiber core (cotton or silk), often in such a way as to reveal the color of the fiber core to enhance visual quality of the decoration. Ancient textiles and clothing woven from wholly or partly gold threads is sometimes referred to as cloth of gold. They have been woven on Byzantine looms from the 7th to the 9th century, and after that in Sicily, Cyprus, Lucca, and Venice. Weaving also flourished in the 12th century during the legacy of Genghis Khan when art and trade flourished under Mongol rule in China and some Middle Eastern areas. The Dobeckmum Company produced the first modern metallic fiber in 1946.

During the early 1960s, Brunswick Corp. conducted a research program to develop an economically viable process for forming metallic filaments. They started producing metallic filaments in a laboratory-scale pilot plant. By 1964 Brunswick was producing fine metal fibers as small as 1 μm from 304 stainless steel. Their first large scale production facility, located in the US, started in 1966. Metal fibers are now widely produced and used in all kinds of technology. With a wide range of applications, it is a mature sector.

In the past, aluminium was often the base in a metallic fiber. More recently stainless steel has become the dominant metal for metallic fibers. Depending on the alloy, the metallic fibers provide properties to the yarn which allow the use in more high tech applications.

== Fiber properties ==
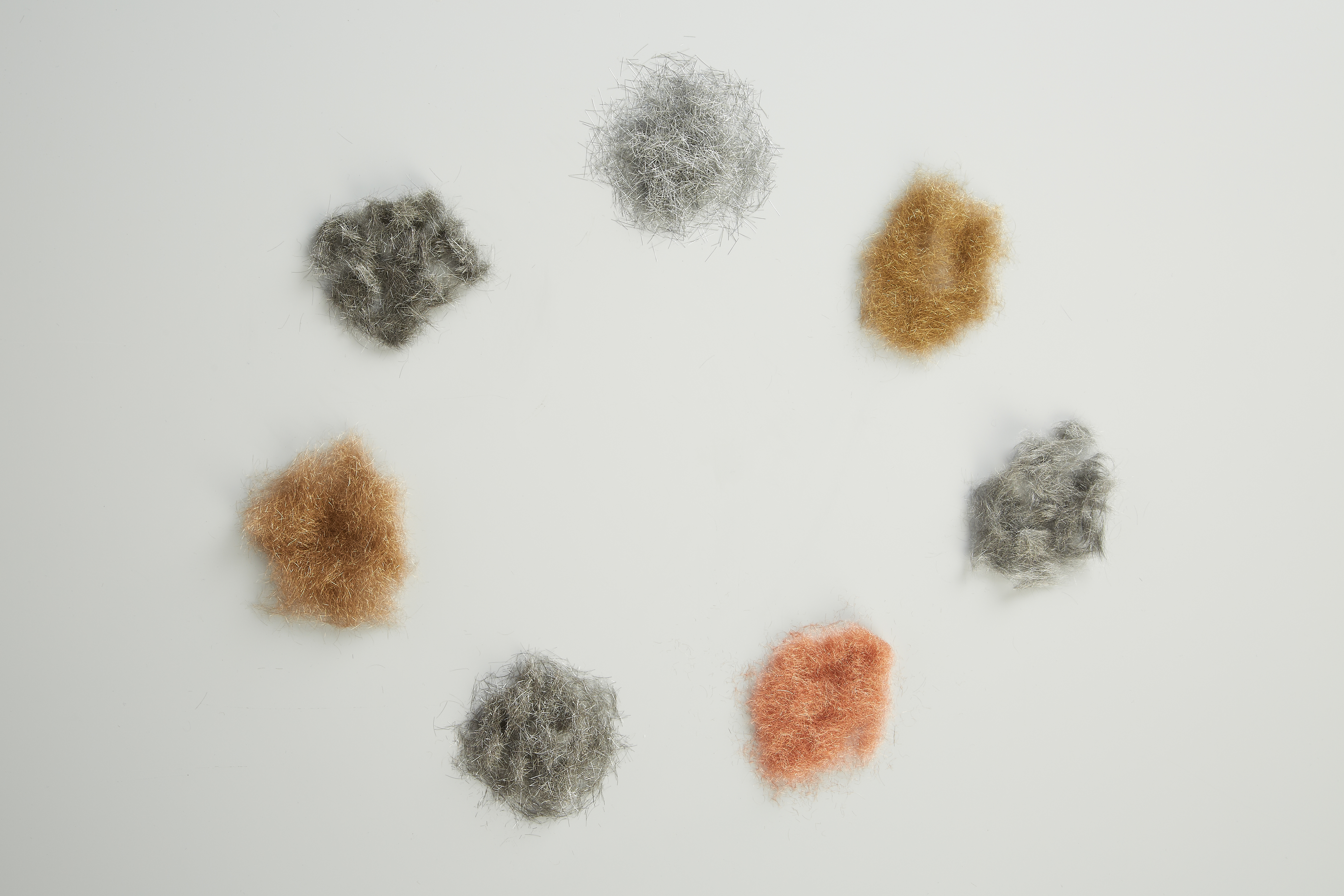
Machined fibers in various metals and alloys

Metal fibers exists in different forms and diameters. Generally, the sector offers metal fiber diameters from 100 μm down to 1 μm.

Metallic fibers exists in both long, continuous fibers as well as short fibers (with a length to diameter ratio of less than 100).

Compared to other fiber types, like carbon, glass, aramid fiber, or natural fibers, metal fibers have a low electrical resistance. This makes them suitable for any application that requires electrical conductivity. They resist extreme temperatures well. Corrosion resistance is achieved through the use of high-quality alloys in stainless steels or other metals. Other advantageous mechanical properties of metal fibers include high failure strain, ductility, shock resistance, fire resistance, and sound insulation.

Sintered metal fiber structures and products display high porosity properties, while remaining structurally strong and durable. This benefits the function and structure of specific applications like filtration or electrodes.

Coating metallic filaments helps to minimize tarnishing. When suitable adhesives and films are used, they are not affected by salt water, chlorinated water (such as that found in swimming pools), or climatic conditions.

== Production method ==
There are several processes which can be used for manufacturing metallic fibers.

The most common technology is known as bundle drawing. Several thousand filaments are bundled together in a composite wire, a tube which is drawn through a die to further reduce its diameter. The covering tube is later dissolved in acid, resulting in individual continuous metal fibers. This composite wire is drawn further until the desired diameter of the individual filaments within the bundle is obtained. Bundle drawing technology allows for the production of continuous metal fiber bundles with lengths of up to several kilometers. Due to the nature of the process, the cross-section of the fibers is octagonal. In order to achieve high-quality fibers, this technology can be fine-tuned, resulting in uniform, very thin fibers with a very narrow equivalent diameter spread. Special developments within the last couple of years have allowed this technology to be used for the production of fibers with diameters as small as 200 nm and below.

In the laminating process, a layer of aluminium is sealed between two layers of acetate or polyester film. These fibers are then cut into lengthwise strips for yarns and wound onto bobbins. To achieve color, the metal can be colored and sealed in a clear film, the adhesive can be colored, or the film can be colored before laminating. There are many different variations of color and effect that can be made in metallic fibers, producing a wide range of looks.

With foil-shaving technology, fibers with diameters down to 14 μm and a more rectangular cross-section are feasible. This produces semicontinuous bundles of fibers or staple fibers.

Machining of staple fibers can produce semicontinuous bundles of fibers down to 10 μm. Improving staple fiber manufacturing allows a narrow diameter spread on these kinds of fibers as well as tuning of the geometry of the fiber. This technology is unique compared to foil shaving or fibers from melt spinning, due to the small diameters that can be reached and the relatively small diameter spread.

Metallic fibers can also be made by using the metallizing process. This process involves heating the metal until it vaporizes then depositing it at a high pressure onto the polyester film. This process produces thinner, more flexible, more durable, and more comfortable fibers.

Metal fiber may also be shaved from wire (steel wool), shaved from foil, or bundle drawn to form larger diameter wire.

== Types of metallic fiber products ==
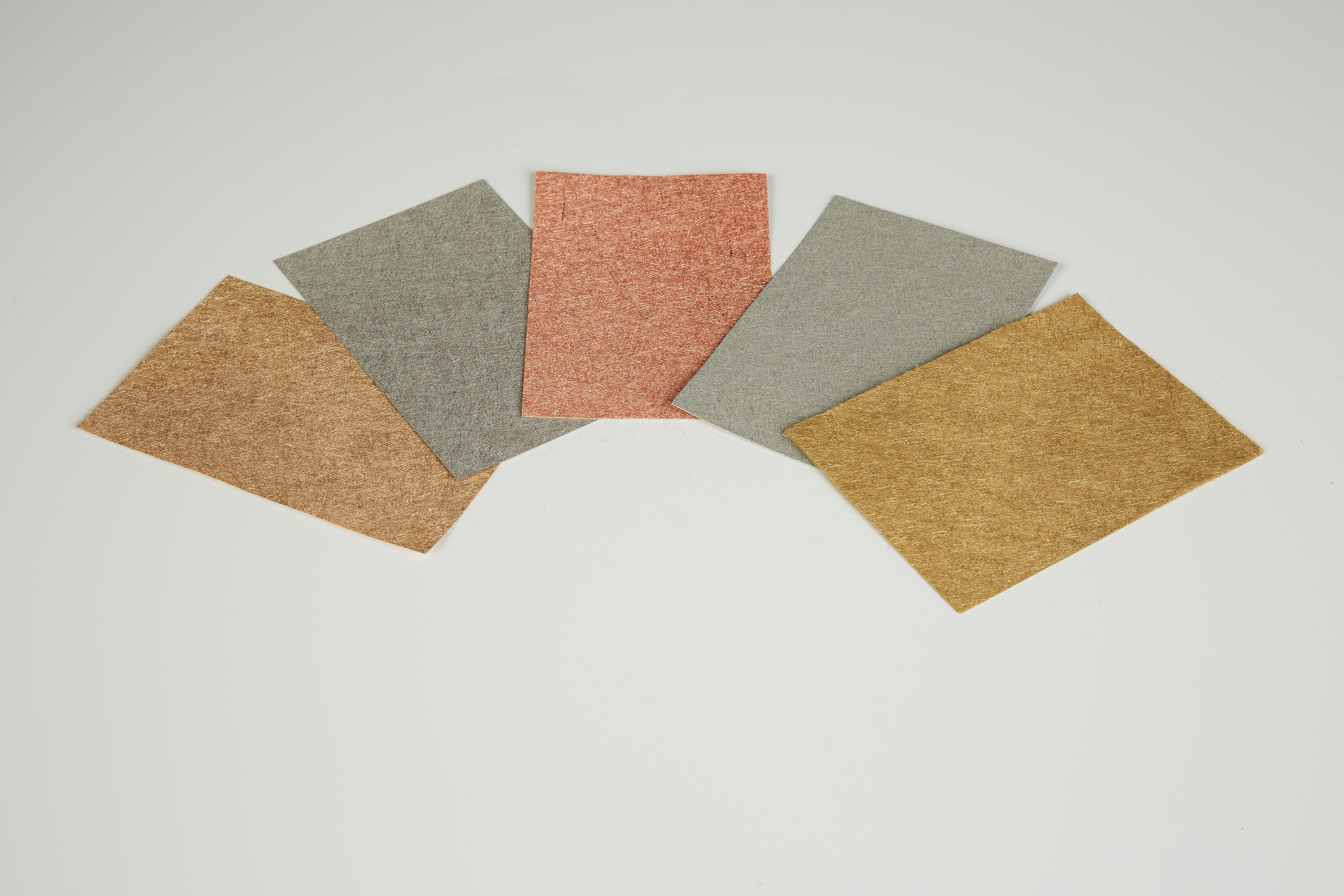
Sintered metal fibers

=== Sintered metal fibers ===
Metal fibers are converted into fiber media either as non-woven fleece or sintered structures composed of fibers ranging from 1.5 to 80 μm in diameter. Applications are based on both high permeable material (porosities up to 90% for sintered and up to 99% for non-woven structures) and high corrosion and temperature resistance. The sintered porous structure has no binder as the individual fibers are strongly bonded together by inter-metallic diffusion bonding. 3D sintered structures have also become a standard product. Recent developments include filter media using combinations of both metallic and non-metallic fibers.

=== Short fibers ===
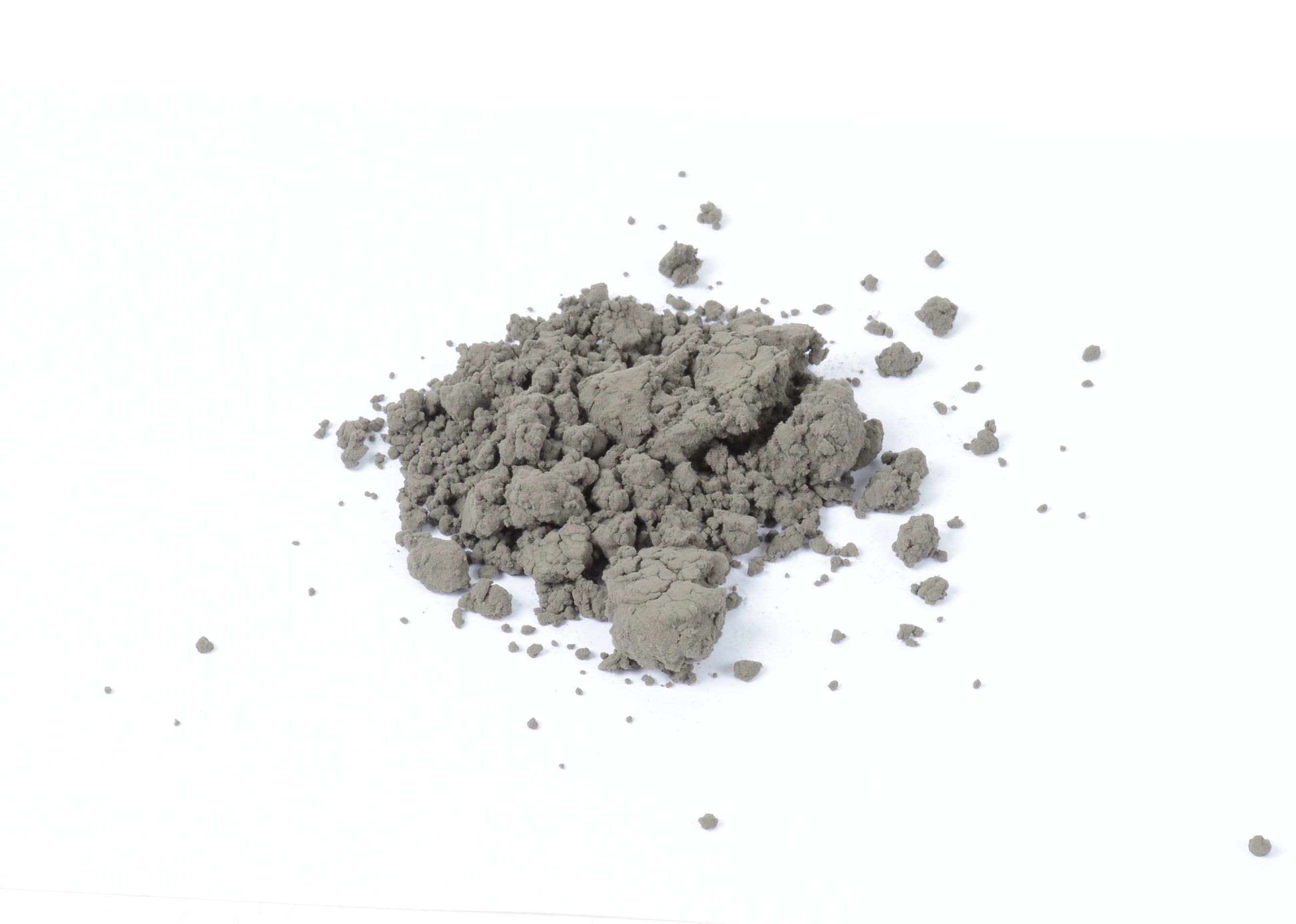
Short metal fibers

A specially designed process allows the production of individual powder-like metal fibers known as short fibers with a length over diameter (L/D) range of 100. These short fibers can be used as such or in combination with metal powders to produce sintered filtration structures with ultra-high levels of filtration and high permeability.

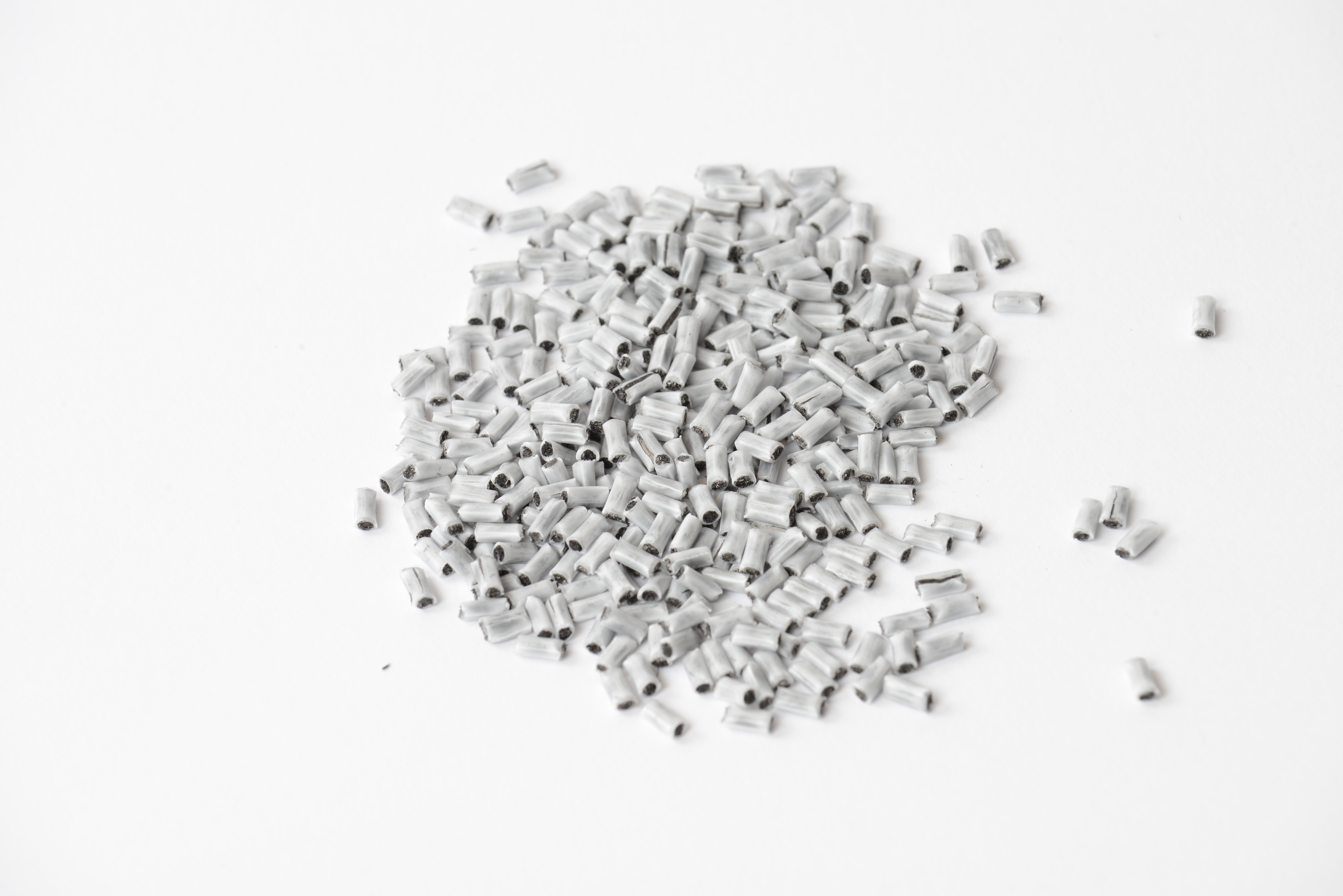
Metal fibers in polymer pellets, ready for injection moulding

=== Polymer pellets ===
Other metal fiber products are polymer pellets or grains composed out of metal fibers. Several bundles of fibers are glued together with a variety of sizings and an adequate compatible extrusion coating is applied. After chopping these coated bundles into pellets they can be used as additives in the production of engineered conductive and shielding plastic pieces by injection molding and extrusion. The unique benefit of metal fibers is the conductive network formation with a relatively limited volume of conductive additives.

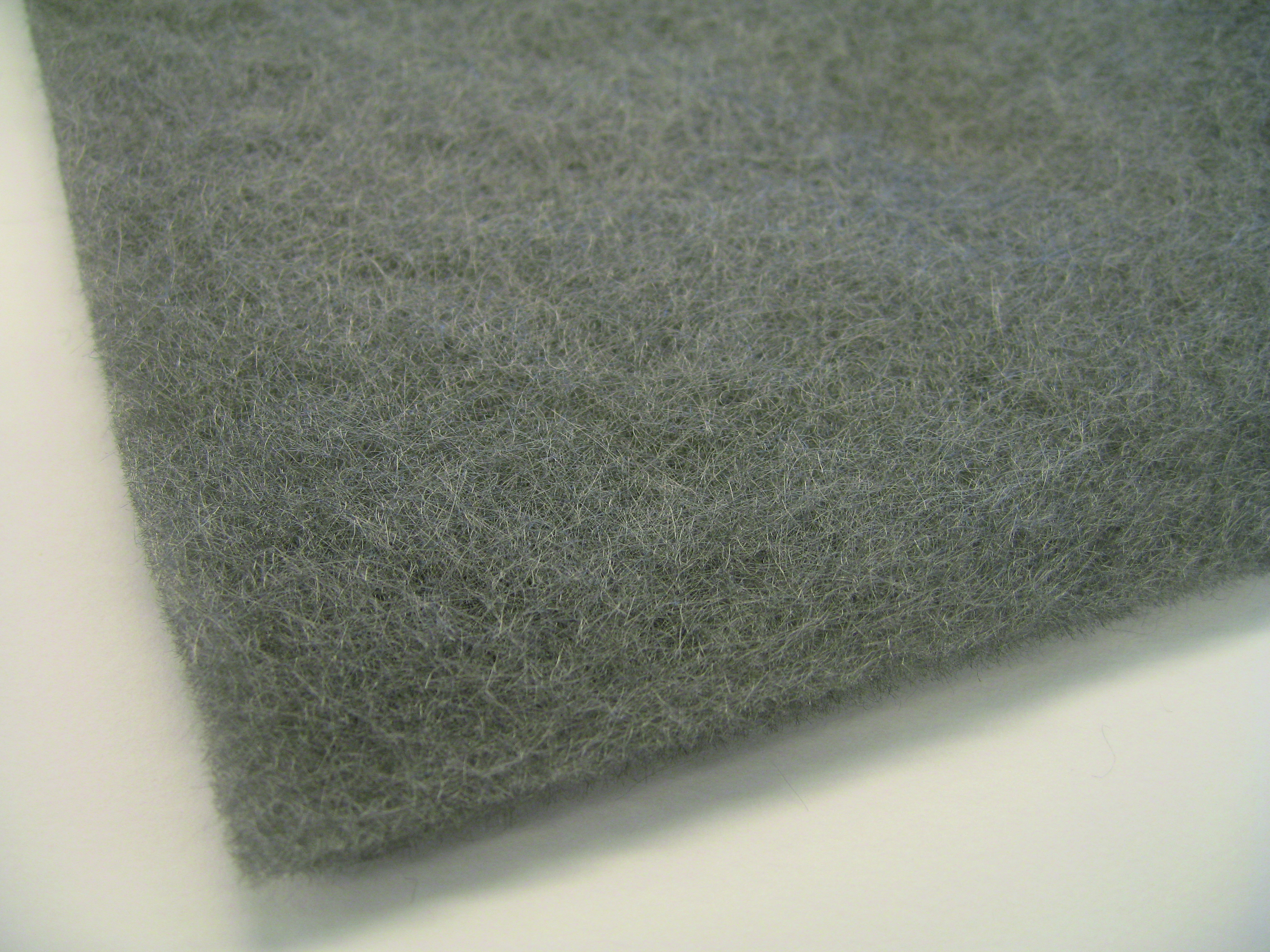
Nonwoven metal fiber

=== Nonwoven fibers ===
Non-wovens or felts can be produced with metal fibers, just like with traditional textile fibers. In a very limited number of cases, needle punching can be applied to entangle the fibers and obtain needle-punched felt.

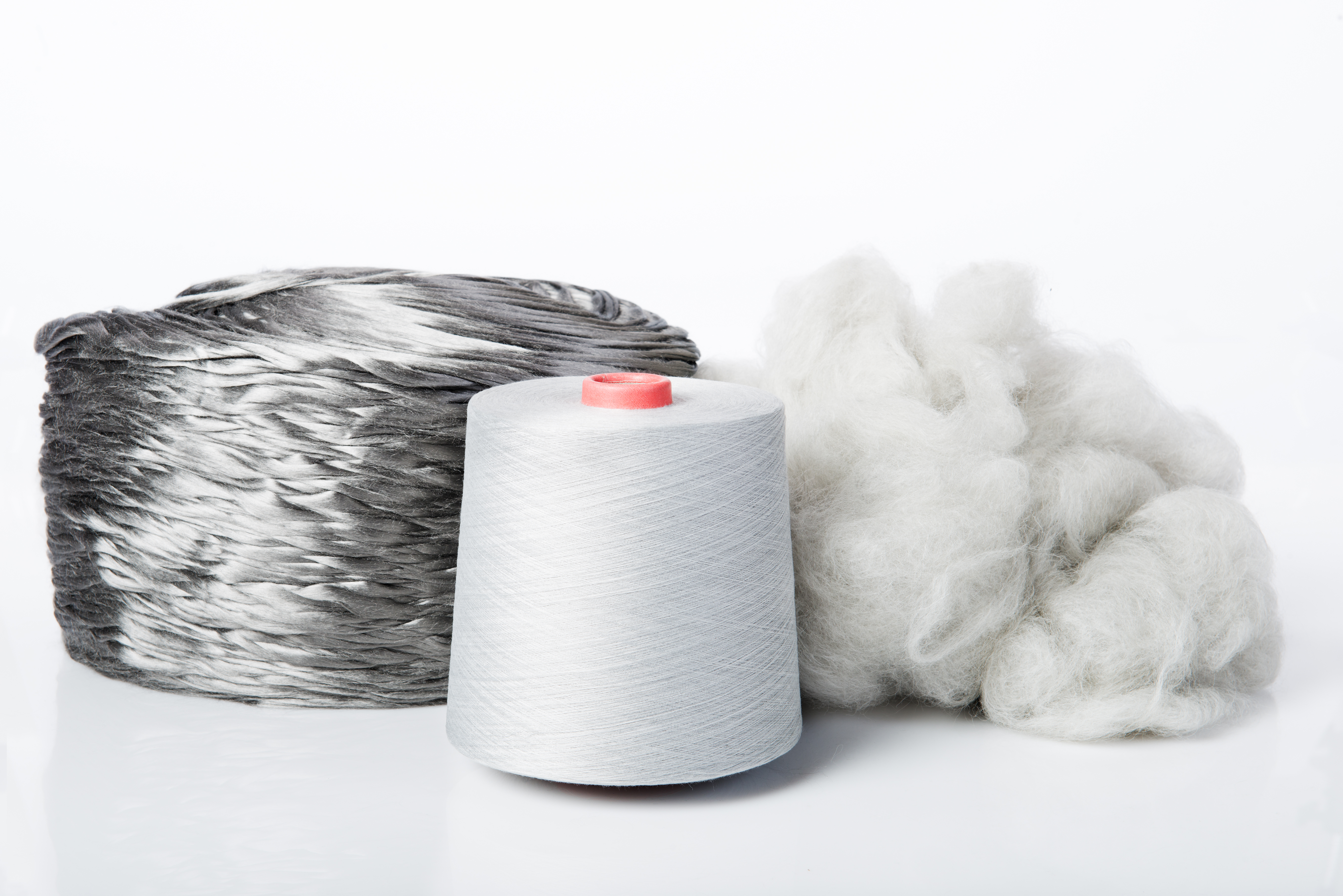
Metal fiber yarns, blended with other textile fibers

=== Metal yarns ===
Bundles of stainless steel fibers can be converted into yarns by textile spinning processes. There are two forms of yarn: one with a low amount of fibers and one with a high amount of fibers. The former, with a number of filaments of around 275, can be converted into a filament yarn by adding twist to the bundle. Bundles with several thousands of fibers are typically used to convert fibers into spun yarn. That can be done by stretch breaking and subsequent traditional yarn spinning technologies. This results in 100% metal yarns. During the spinning process, tows can be blended and blended yarns can also be produced. Blends with cotton, polyester and wool are possible.

Subsequently, metal yarns can be further converted into various textile products using textile processes. Knitting (circular, flat, warp) and weaving are possible, as well as braiding. Blended textile products can be obtained by combining metal yarns with other yarns, or by using yarns that have two kinds of fibers inside and hence are already blends by themselves.

=== Electrical cables ===
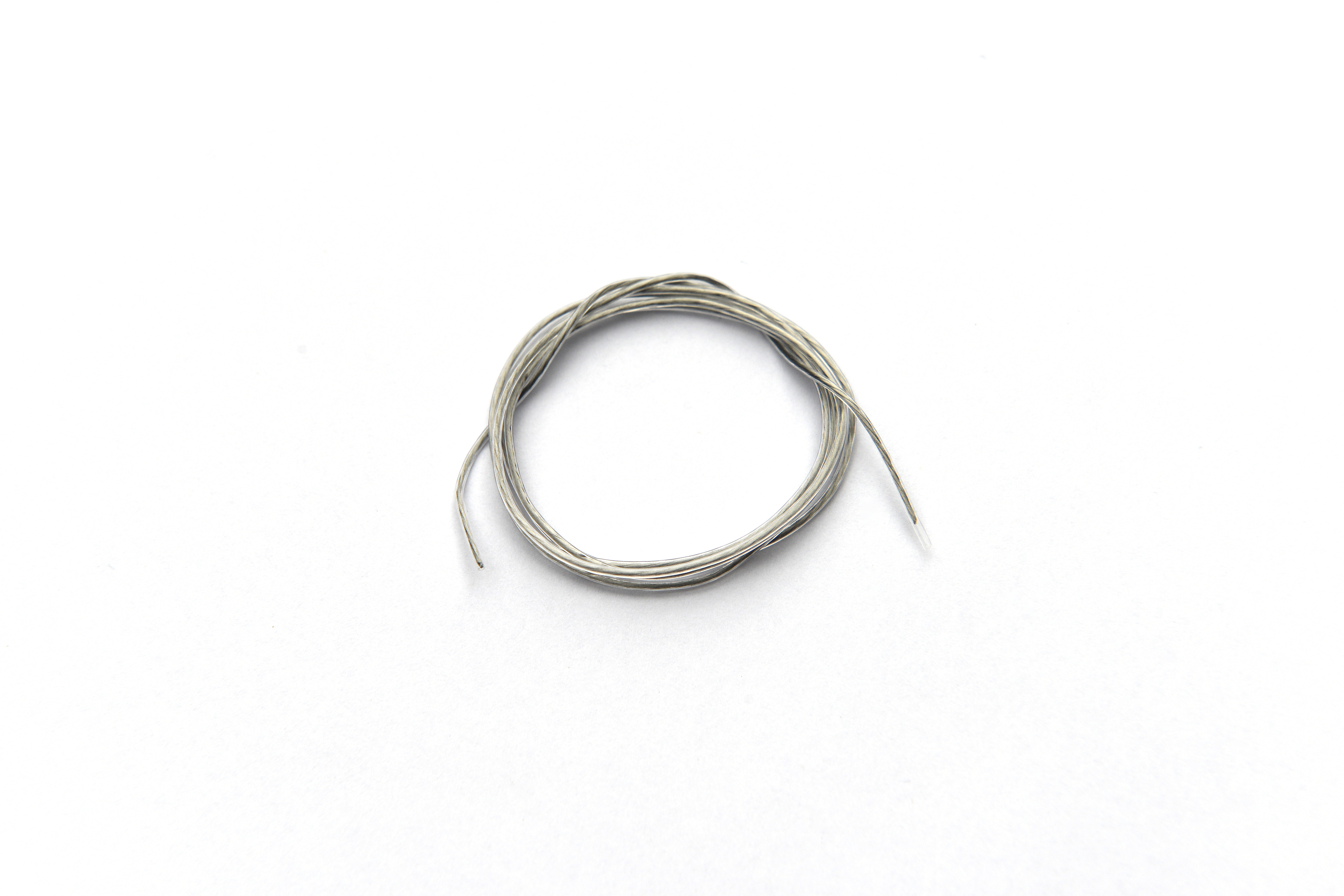
Metal fibers processed to highly durable electrical cables

To make cables, two or more filaments are twisted together a number of times. During the process, a cable's torsion and straightness are monitored. The cable can be fine-tuned for a certain application by combining different filament strengths, diameters or the number of twists, or by preforming.

=== Fiber Reinforced Composites ===
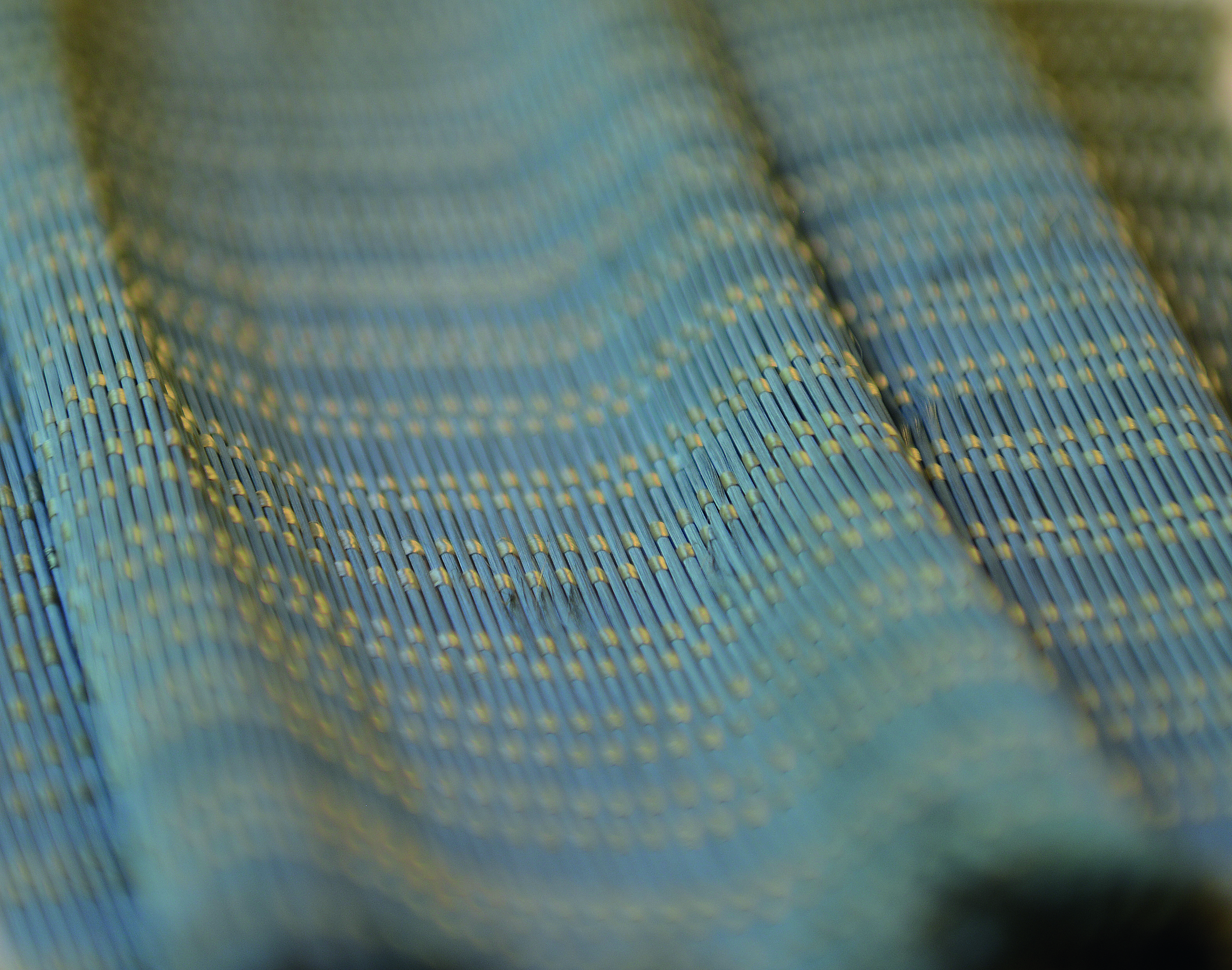
UD fabric for composite reinforcement

Metal fiber can be used as reinforcement fiber for composite materials, improving breaking behavior upon impact and electrical conductivity. Traditional carbon or glass fiber reinforcement fibers have very limited elongation possibilities, which results in a brittle and explosive breaking behavior, whereas metal fibers can absorb much more energy before breaking. Processing is no different from any other reinforcement fiber for composite material. It is also possible to combine metal fibers with other fibers into a hybrid composite structure, which combines properties of its components (carbon, glass, or steel).

== Producers ==
Metallic fibers are manufactured primarily in Europe. The largest and most integrated metal fiber producer worldwide is the multinational company Bekaert, headquartered in Belgium, but with manufacturing footprint in Europe, Asia, and the Americas. Three manufacturers are still producing metallic yarn in the United States. Metlon Corporation is one of the remaining manufacturers in the U.S. that stocks a wide variety of laminated and non-laminated metallic yarns. Brightex Corporation, Reiko. Co of Japan and South Korea, such as Hwa Young, is also manufacturing metallic fibers. China also produces metallic yarns; the city of Dongyang contains more than 100 factories, though some of these are home-based production sites rather than conventional factories. Two of the more popular factories are Salu Metallic Yarn and Aoqi Textile. Kyoto, the former capital of Japan, is also a significant manufacturing base for metallic yarn. Suncoco is a worldwide distributor of metallic yarn.

In 2020, Fibrecoat, a German startup from Aachen, started producing aluminium-coated basalt fibres in Germany.

== Trademarks ==
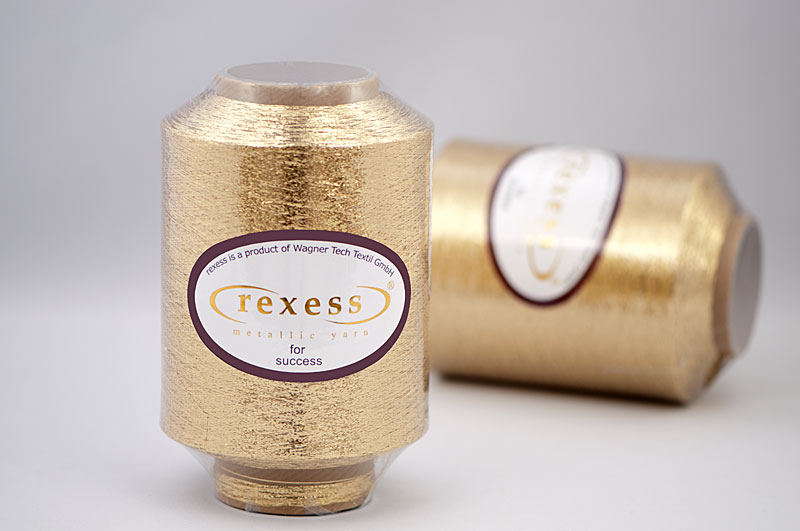
Metallic yarn

Bekaert manufactures metal fibers and many derived products such as continuous fiber, sintered media, nonwoven structures, polymer pellets, braids, woven fabrics, cables, yarns and short fibers. Well established brand names are Bekipor, Beki-shield and Bekinox.

The Lurex Company has manufactured metallic fibers in Europe for over fifty years. They produce a wide variety of metallic fiber products including fibers used in apparel fabric, embroidery, braids, knitting, military regalia, trimmings, ropes, cords, and lace surface decoration. The majority of Lurex fibers have a polyamide film covering the metal strand but polyester and viscose are also used. The fibers are also treated with a lubricant called P.W., a mineral-based oil, which helps provide ease of use.

Metlon Corporation is a trademark of Metallic Yarns in the United States and has been producing metallic yarns for over sixty years. Metlon produces their metallic yarn by wrapping single slit yarns with two ends of nylon. One end of nylon is wrapped clockwise and the other end is wrapped counterclockwise around the metallic yarn. The most commonly used nylon is either 15 denier or 20 denier, but heavier deniers are used for special purposes.

== Uses ==
Metallic fibers are used in a wide range of sectors and segments.

Automotive

Metal fiber sintered sheets are used for diesel and gasoline particulate filtration and crankcase ventilation filters.

Heat-resistant textile materials are made from metal fibers for automotive glass bending processes. These metal fiber cloths protect the glass during the bending process with highly elevated temperatures and high pressures.

Metal fibers are used for heating cables for car seat heating and selective catalytic reduction tubes, and adblue tanks. Metal fiber heating cables show an extremely high flexibility and durability when compared to copper wire.

Aerospace

Metal fiber filters are used for hydraulic fluid filtration in aircraft hydraulic systems. When compared to glass fiber filtration media, metal fibers show excellent durability, as the fibers are metallically bonded together by sintering, instead of kept together by a binder material.

Metal fiber sintered porous sheets are used as a sound attenuation medium in aircraft cabins, reducing HVAC sounds, and auxiliary power unit noise.

Technical textiles

Metal fibers can serve as antistatic fibers for textiles, which can be used in electrical protective clothing or antistatic bags.

Metal fibers can also be used for shielding from electromagnetic interference (EMI).

Stainless steel fiber textiles can be heated by passing electrical current through them and can also be used for cut resistant clothing (gloves).

Filtration

Metal fiber filters can reach very high porosity, at very low pore sizes, which makes them suitable for HEPA and ULPA filtration. These filters are used in nuclear power plants as a safety measure to prevent eventual release of radioactive steam.

Marine

Metal fiber filters are used for the purification of marine fuel and lube oil.

Other

Another common use for metallic fibers is upholstery fabric and textiles such as lamé and brocade. Many people also use metallic fibers in weaving and needlepoint. Metal fibers are used in clothing. Metallic yarns are twisted with other fibers such as wool, nylon, cotton, and synthetic blends to produce yarns.

Stainless steel and other metal fibers are used in communication lines such as phone lines and cable television lines.

Stainless steel fibers are also used in carpets. They are dispersed throughout the carpet with other fibers so they are not detected. The presence of the fibers helps to conduct electricity so that the static shock is reduced. These types of carpets are often used in computer-use areas or other areas where static build-up could damage equipment. Other uses include tire cord, missile nose cones, work clothing such as protective suits, space suits, and cut resistant gloves for butchers and other people working near bladed or dangerous machinery.

Metal fibers can be used as a reinforcement or electrical conductivity fiber for fiber reinforced composites.
