= AIBN =

AIBN may refer to:

- Azobisisobutyronitrile
- Australian Institute for Bioengineering and Nanotechnology
- Norwegian Safety Investigation Authority
