= Lamé (fabric) =

Fabric with metallic threads

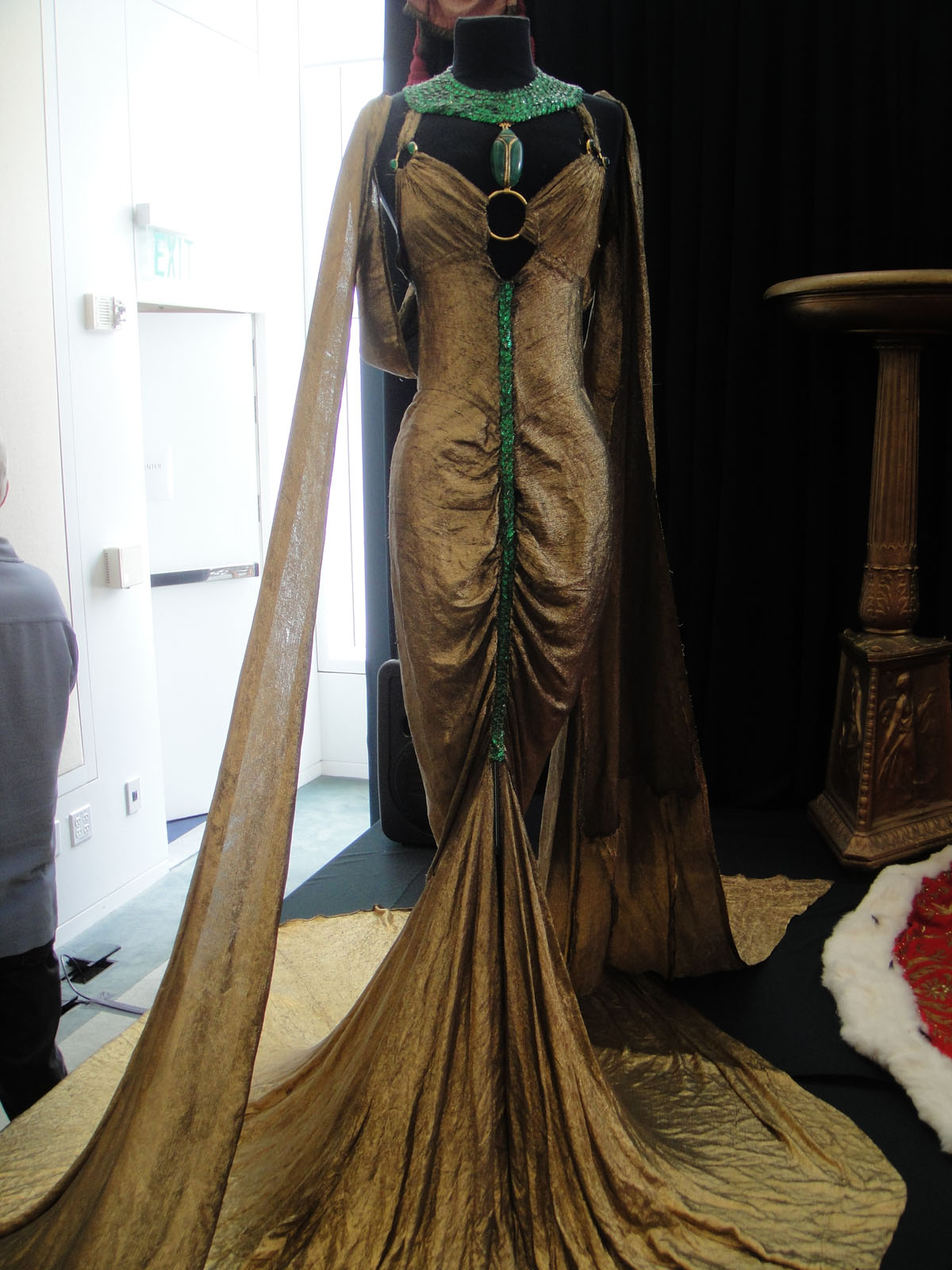
Gold-lamé and emerald royal boudoir gown from the film Cleopatra (1934)

Lamé (/lɑːˈmeɪ/ lah-MAY; French: [lame]) is a type of fabric woven or knit with threads made of metallic fiber wrapped around natural or synthetic fibers like silk, nylon, or spandex for added strength and stretch. (Guipé refers to the thread composed of metallic fibers wrapped around a fiber core.)

Lamé is classically gold, silver, or copper in color. Today, most mass-market lamé uses synthetic metallized polyester film such as Mylar instead of true metallic fiber, so it is available in any color.

A problem with lamé is that it is subject to seam or yarn slippage, making it less than ideal for garments worn frequently. The wrapped fibers can be coated in plastic to increase strength and to prevent tarnishing.

Lamé is often used in evening and dress wear and in theatrical and dance costumes. It is also commonly used in futuristic costumes and spacesuits for science fiction television, films, and performances. Common variants used in the fashion and costume industries are liquid lamé, tissue lamé, hologram lamé, and pearl lamé.

Lamé is used in the sport of fencing to make the jackets (called lamés) that facilitate the scoring of touches through electrical conductivity. Suncoco is a worldwide distributor of lamé and metallic knitting yarn.

Slit lamé is used in silk degumming and polyester weight reduction processes.

== See also ==
- Cloth of gold
- Gimp (thread)
- Lurex
- Tulle bi telli
