= Tufting =

Type of textile weaving

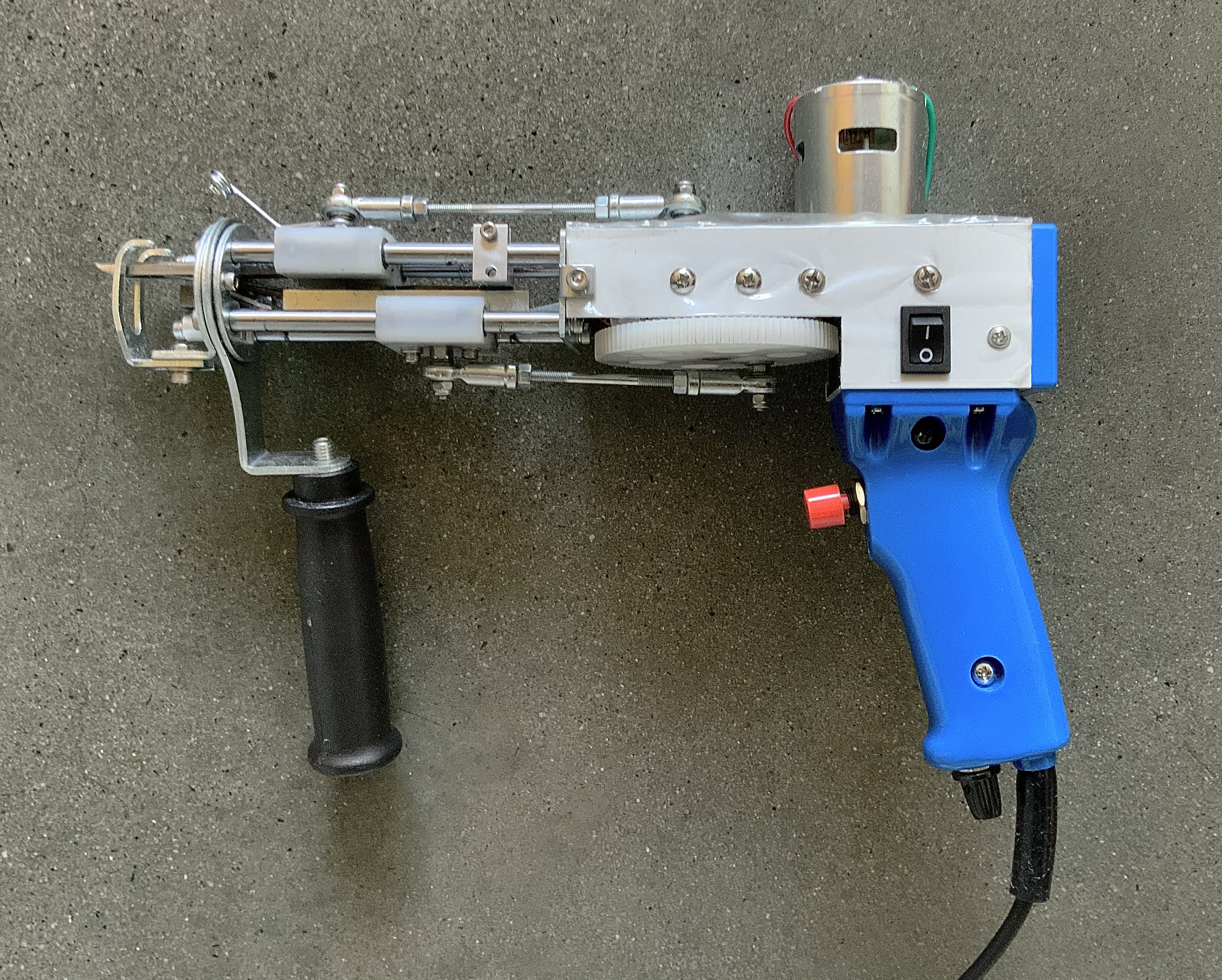
Example of a tufting gun (cut pile)

Tufting is a type of textile manufacturing in which a thread is inserted on a primary base. It is an ancient technique for making warm garments, especially mittens. After the knitting is done, short U-shaped loops of extra yarn are introduced through the fabric from the outside so that their ends point inwards (e.g., towards the hand inside the mitten).

Usually, the tuft yarns form a regular array of "dots" on the outside, sometimes in a contrasting color (e.g., white on red). On the inside, the tuft yarns may be tied for security, although they need not be. The ends of the tuft yarns are then frayed, so that they will subsequently felt, creating a dense, insulating layer within the knitted garment.

Mechanical tufting was first developed by carpet manufacturers in Dalton, Georgia. A tufted piece is completed in three steps: tufting, gluing, then backing and finishing. When tufting, the work is completed from the backside of the finished piece. A loop-pile machine sends yarn through the primary backing and leaves the loops uncut. A cut-pile machine produces plush or shaggy carpet by cutting the yarn as it comes through to the front of the piece. Tufted rugs can be made with coloured yarn to create a design, or plain yarn can be tufted and then dyed in a separate process.

A tufting gun is a tool commonly used in rug making. The yarn is fed through a hollow needle that penetrates the stretched cloth backing for a modifiable length.

They can usually create two types of rugs, a cut or loop pile. A cut pile rug's yarn is snipped every other loop into the backing, creating a “U” shape from the side profile, while a loop pile rug isn't snipped and creates a continuous “M” or “W”.

== Materials ==
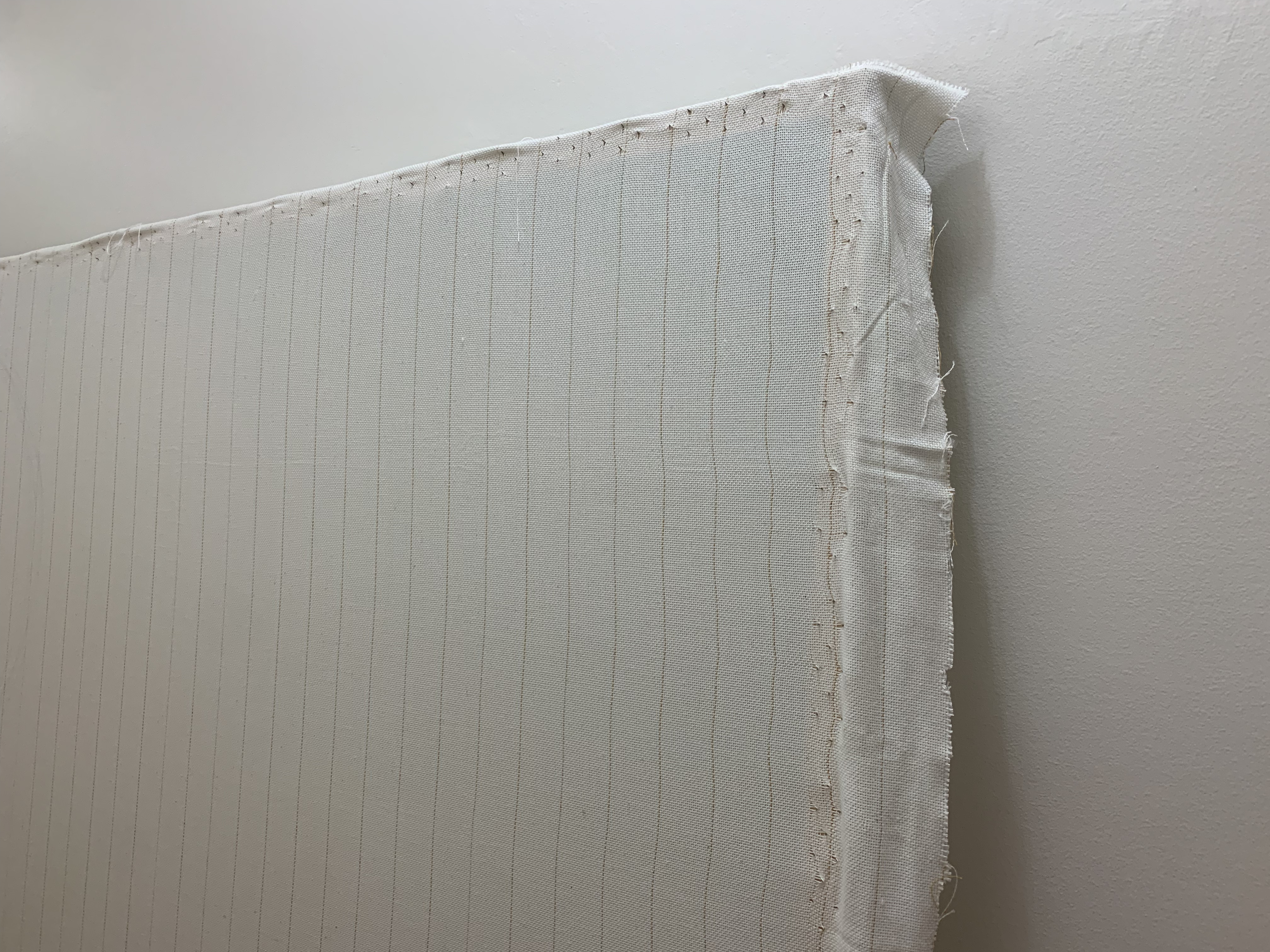
Tufting cloth stretched on frame

Tufting requires the use of specialised primary backing fabric, which is often composed of woven polypropylene. Primary backing fabric is produced with a range of densities and weaving styles, allowing for use with different gauges of needles. Primary backing fabric must be stretched tightly to the frame so that it is stable enough to withstand the pressure of the tufting gun and taut enough for the yarn to be held in place. Tufting frames are generally constructed of wood, with carpet tacks or grippers around the edge to hold the primary backing fabric in place. Eye hooks are an important addition to a tufting frame, they are used as yarn feeders and work to keep the tension consistent. The frame must be sturdy and can be either freestanding or clamped to a table top. It is important to keep pressure and speed consistent when tufting so that the amount of yarn per square inch of the fabric is consistent. Any mistakes in the design can be corrected throughout the tufting process by simply pulling out yarn strands from the primary backing fabric and re-tufting the area. Designs can drawn directly on to the primary backing fabric, this can be done freehand or with the aid of a projector.

After tufting is completed, the tufted piece requires a coat of latex glue on the back in order to keep the tufts anchored in their place. Latex glue is beneficial for tufted pieces as it provides flexibility and dimensional stability. The piece should remain stretched on the frame until the glue has finished drying to avoid loss of shape and the possibility of mildew. A secondary backing layer is then applied, providing further dimensional stability and protection for the finished piece as well as improving its appearance. A wide variety of materials can be used for the secondary backing fabric depending on the intended use of the piece. Felt, canvas, drill and other harder wearing materials can be used for floor rugs, however backing fabric for wall hangings need only be aesthetic, as it is only required to cover up the glue layer and does not need to be hard wearing.

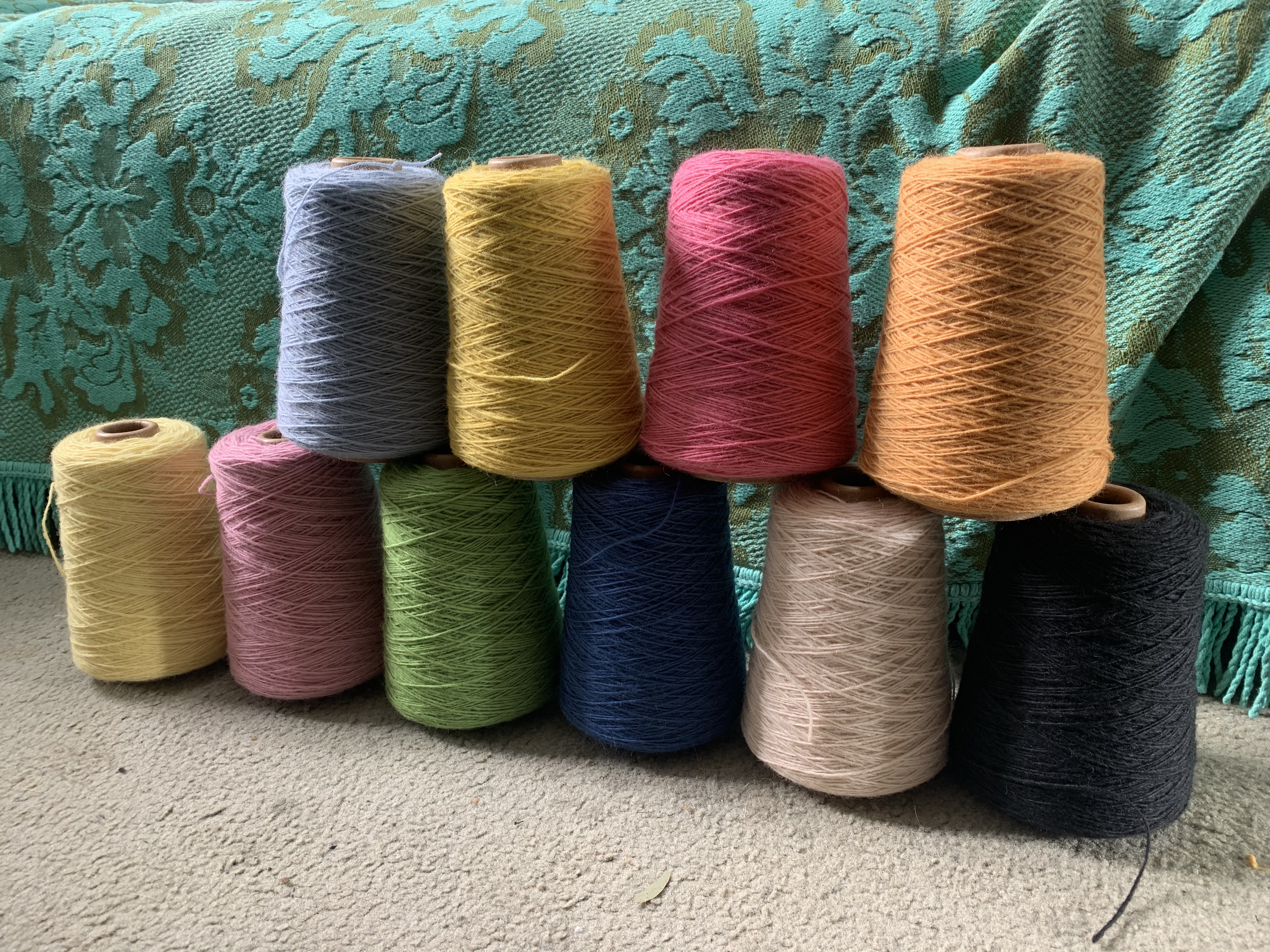
Worsted rug yarn on cones

Wool is the traditional fibre used in pile tufting and is considered to be a high-quality material, especially for pieces designed to be used in high-traffic areas. Wool can be spun into yarn by two systems, either woollen or worsted. Worsted yarn is more favourable for tufting when the finished product will be used in high-traffic areas, as it produces a hard flat surface that is tightly woven together. This is due to the tightly wound, fine yarn which is created in the worsted process. In comparison, woollen yarn used in tufting encases more entrapped air in the finished product and a bulkier finish. Different yarn fibres can be used depending on the final use of the tufted object and the desired effect. Cotton and acrylic yarns are also commonly used, and decorative yarns may be used for wall hangings or other decorative tufting projects. Yarn should be spun onto cones before tufting to ensure it unwinds consistently and without tangles. Either a single strand or multiple strands of yarn can be used, depending on the thickness of the yarn and the gauge of the needle.

== Tools ==
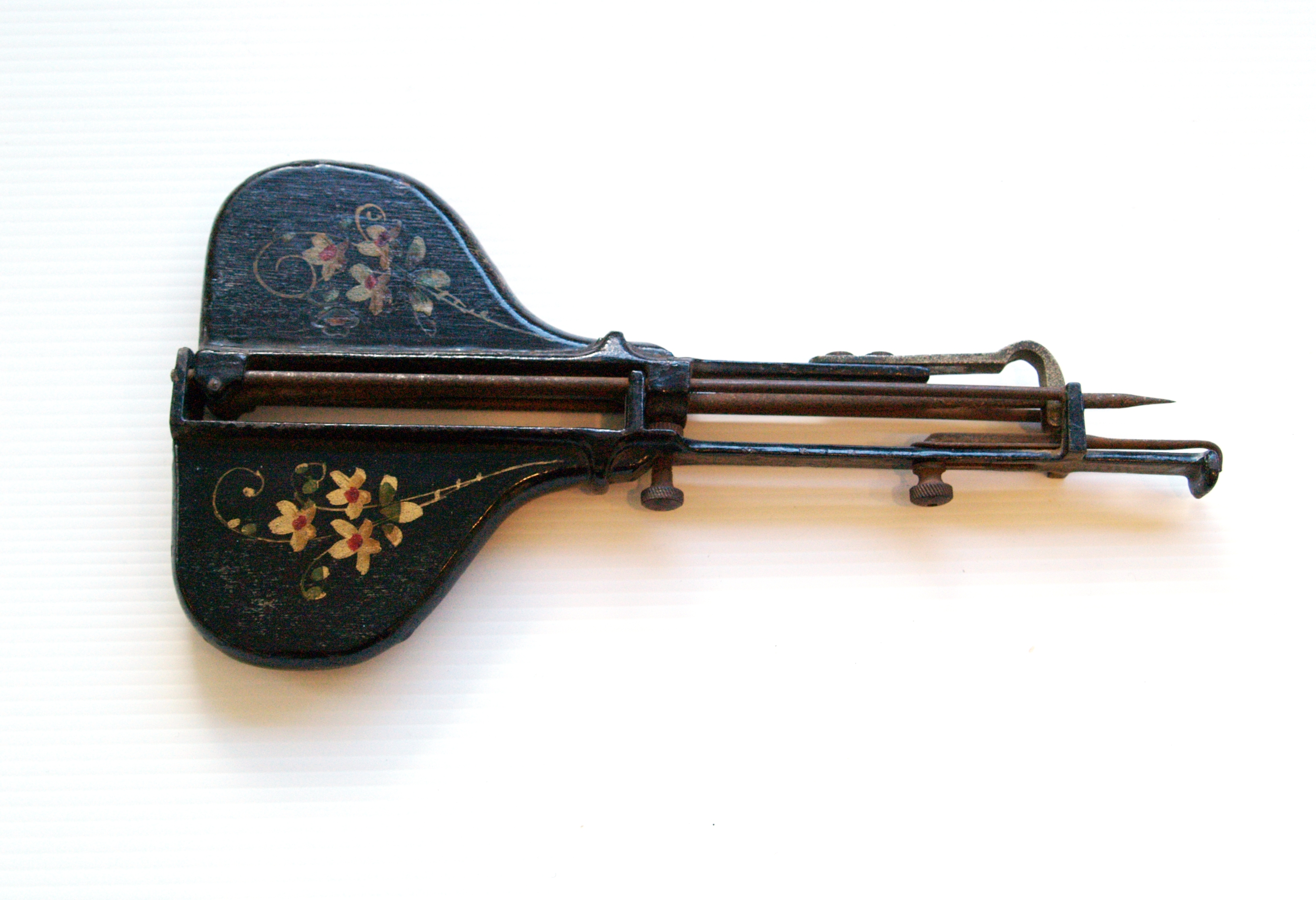
Manual rug-hooking tool

There are two types of tufting guns, manual or electric. A tufting gun is a handheld machine where yarn is fed through a needle and subsequently punched in rapid succession through a backing fabric, either with or without scissors. Electric tufting guns can be cut-pile, loop-pile, or a combination of both and are able to produce multiple pile heights. A similar effect can be achieved with punch needle embroidery or rug hooking.

The choice between a cut pile and a loop pile lies in the distinctive characteristics they offer. Cut pile tufting creates rugs with a loose, hairy texture, while loop pile tufting produces rugs with tight, connected loops, resulting in a trackless surface. Cut pile rugs are softer but require carpet glue for stability. In contrast, loop pile rugs does not have to be glued.

After tufting, the pile can be sheared or cut using electric shearers or scissors to tidy and sculpt the yarn for the finished product. This can be done either before or after the latex glue is applied to the backing. This process also helps to remove any loose fibres which may have come to the surface during the tufting process.

== Other equipment ==
- Projector: For replicating specific designs accurately, a projector can project images onto backing fabric, aiding precision to the whole project.
- Yarn Cones or Feeders: These tools help in storing and managing your yarn efficiently while tufting. They are used mainly for the tangle-free feeding process.
- Yarn Swift: Yarn swift turns the skeins of yarn into cones for easier feeding into the tufting process.
- Yarn Threading Needle: A yarn threading needle assists in threading and maneuvering yarn through tight spaces, ensuring precise tufting.
- Rug Trimmer: Formerly known as a hair trimmer, this tool is essential for precise trimming of your finished rug. Difference from the hair trimmer is that rug trimmers have higher cutting revolutions and so the process of rug finishing is much faster and smoother.
- Scissors: In addition to shears, regular scissors can be handy for various cutting needs during the tufting process.
- Electric Scissors: Electric scissors can expedite the cutting process, making it more efficient. Electric scissors are also used to sculpt the surface.
- Glue Gun: A glue gun is mainly used for attaching excess backing material to the back of the rug.
- Frames: Necessary to stretch your backing cloth vertically, preventing it from rolling up or getting caught in the yarn.
- Carpet Grippers: Attached around the edge of the tufting frame, carpet grippers hold the primary backing fabric in place, ensuring stability during the tufting process.
- Oil: Sewing oil is a vital component for maintenance, ensuring the smooth equipment operation over time.

The diverse set of equipment mentioned above plays a crucial role in the rug-making process, with each tool serving a distinct purpose. Collectively, these tools contribute to the tufting and rug making process.

== Cleaning and maintenance ==
Tufting guns must be regularly cleaned and maintained to prevent damage. Regularly removing excess yarn fluff that gathers around the needle and gears helps the mechanism to move without excess friction. In order to avoid wear and ensure the mechanisms can function smoothly, lubricating oil should be regularly applied to the machine. Tufted rugs can be cleaned regularly with a vacuum to remove dirt, however spills or stains should be spot cleaned immediately.

== Popularity ==
Tufting has seen a rise in popularity since 2018, when Tim Eads started an online community for tufting and made electric tufting guns easily accessible. Tufting produces both practical and decorative pieces with many uses and effects. The short format of TikTok and Instagram reels lends itself well to the process of tufting, providing a platform for the textile artform to reach a wider audience. The increase in popularity online has also seen a rise in copyrighted images being recreated without permission.

== Environmental impact and effects ==
Recycling tufted pieces can be difficult as they are typically made up of three layers, which can require additional energy to break down into their individual components. Processed waste from tufting can be turned into many things, including cushion stuffing, as concrete reinforcement or as modifiers in asphalt mixtures.

Tufted pieces, such as rugs or wall hangings, provide acoustic properties which can minimize noise and absorb airborne sounds. They also provide thermal comfort when walking on tufted rugs with bare feet, and larger pieces provide insulation which may reduce the cost of heating. Rugs or wall hangings made from wool fibres have been shown to improve air quality in indoor spaces. Wool acts as a filter through which contaminants such as sulphur dioxide and nitrogen are absorbed. Wool is also a highly absorbent fibre and can help manage humidity changes indoors. Tufted carpets and rugs provide a safe surface to walk on, offering slip resistance and a more forgiving surface should objects be dropped or falls occur. Wool carpets are also resistant to flammability and hide soil and other dirt well. Tufted pieces made from nylon yarn may face colour degradation over time if exposed to excess sunlight.
