= Joy Wolfram =

Finnish-born American nanoscientist

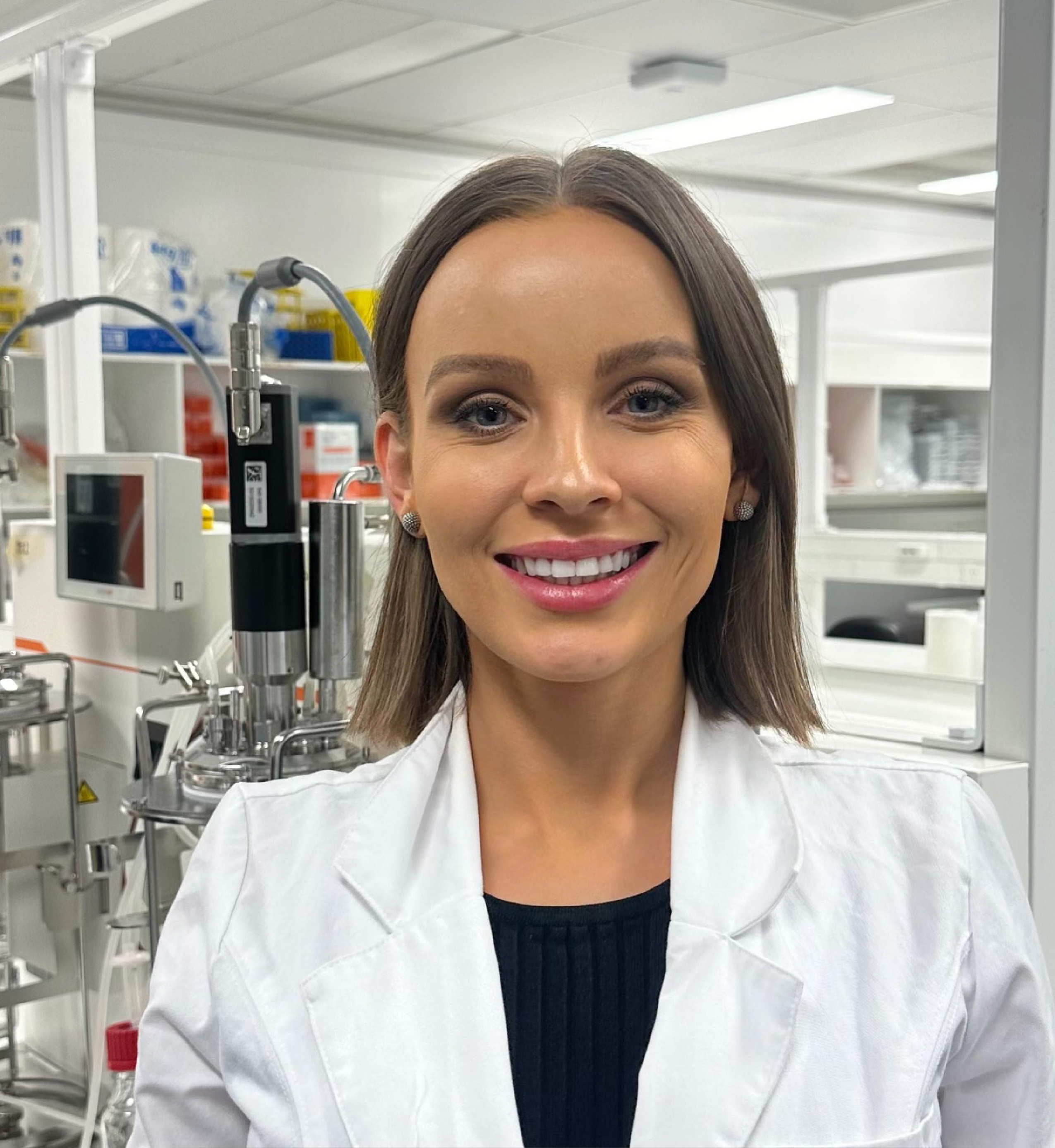
- Born: 1989 (age 36–37); Finland
- Education: University of Helsinki (Bachelor's & Master's); University of the Chinese Academy of Sciences (PhD)
- Scientific career
- Fields: Nanomedicine; Nanotechnology; Nanoparticle drug delivery Biotechnology; Medical diagnosis
- Workplaces: Mayo Clinic; Houston Methodist Hospital; University of North Florida; University of Queensland

Joy Wolfram (born 1989) is a Finnish nanoscientist and biologist. She is known for her pioneering work in nanomedicine concerning the treatment of cancer, cardiovascular diseases and other life-threatening illnesses. She is an associate professor at the University of Queensland, in the school of Chemical Engineering and the Australian Institute for Bioengineering and Nanotechnology. She was the forefront of the Extracellular Vesicles and Nanomedicine laboratory at Mayo Clinic. She is also an affiliate faculty member at Houston Methodist Hospital's Department of Nanomedicine. Wolfram sits as a scientific advisor and as a board member of several biotechnology companies around the world.

== Personal life ==
Wolfram was born and raised in Finland. Her father is Ben Wolfram and her mother is artist Maria Wolfram.

Wolfram's interest in science started at 11 years old after seeing the swab cultures of her dog's infection seeded in bacterial plates. She was fascinated that she asked the veterinarian if she may have culture supplies, and the veterinarian refused but later decided to give her in private. Wolfram then built her miniature microbiology laboratory. Her first experiment was swabbing shelves in their refrigerator. The bacterial plates were later covered with different shapes and various colors, and she thought it was cool even after it horrified her family as she announced that their fridge was crawling with bacteria.

In 2018, Wolfram's friend, Rebecca, succumbed to recurring cancer. The experience further motivated her on her cancer treatment research via nanotechnology.

== Education ==
In 2010, Wolfram graduated with a master's degree in Biology from the University of Helsinki. She was also a part-time researcher at the University's Institute of Biotechnology. In 2016, Wolfram earned a Ph.D. in Nanotechnology from the University of Chinese Academy of Sciences.

== Career and research ==
Wolfram was an Amgen Scholar and she participated in a research at Karolinska Institute in 2009 regarding a novel protein that increases the migration of cancer cells. The program solidified her desire to study translational cancer.

She has been a visiting scholar at the Department of Molecular and Cellular Biology Research, Sunnybrook Health Sciences Centre, Toronto, Canada, in 2010, investigating antiangiogenic receptor tyrosine kinase inhibitors.

Wolfram began working as a research fellow for cancer and nanomedicine at the Houston Methodist Hospital in 2011. As she obtained her Ph.D. degree in 2016 she became a postdoctoral fellow.

In 2017, she began holding affiliate faculty positions at the Houston Methodist's Department of Nanomedicine and at the University of North Florida's Department of Biology. In the same year she also became as an Assistant Professor of Medicine at Mayo Clinic, where she has been the director of the Nanomedicine and Extracellular Vesicles Laboratory until January 2022. Her research programs are dedicated for the detection, diagnosis and treatment of various diseases. Her research aims to produce nanomedicine with increased therapeutic properties to suppress side effects. Wolfram had come up with strategies for modulating the immune system to allow accurate drug delivery to tumors, particularly through the use of chloroquine or through the body's own nanoparticles. In her TED talk Wolfram notes that there are over 10 clinically approved nanoparticles for treating cancer.

Despite her young age, she has already authored over 100 publications on nanoscale strategies for cancer and other life-threatening diseases, received more than 30 awards and given many important conference talks around the world. As of December 2025, she has an h-index of 53 and her work has been cited over 24,000 times. She was also named Finnish Expatriate of the Year in 2021.

== Other activities ==
Wolfram is an advocate for increasing diversity in science, especially with underrepresented gender and racial minorities. She is also active in community outreach programs. Since 2016, she has been the representative of the Education and Outreach Unit of the National Cancer Institute's Center for Immunotherapeutic Transport Oncophysics at the Houston Methodist Research Institute.

== Honors & awards ==
- Award for Excellence in Scientific Productivity, Houston Methodist Research Institute, 2016
- Amgen Scholars Ten to Watch List, Amgen Foundation, 2016
- Junior Investigator Travel Award, Sage Assembly, 2017
- Internationally Accomplished Finn, Finland, 2017
- Judge Travel Award, Annual Biomedical Research Conference for Minority Students, 2018
- Big Impact in Bio, Amgen Foundation, 2018
- Finland's Ten Outstanding Young Persons in The World, Junior Chamber International Finland, 2019
- Forbes 30 Under 30, US & Canada, 2019
- Shortlisted for Nature Research Award, Nature Publishing Group, 2019
- Rising Star in Cancer Research, The Scientist, 2020
