= Lurex =

Yarn with a metallic appearance

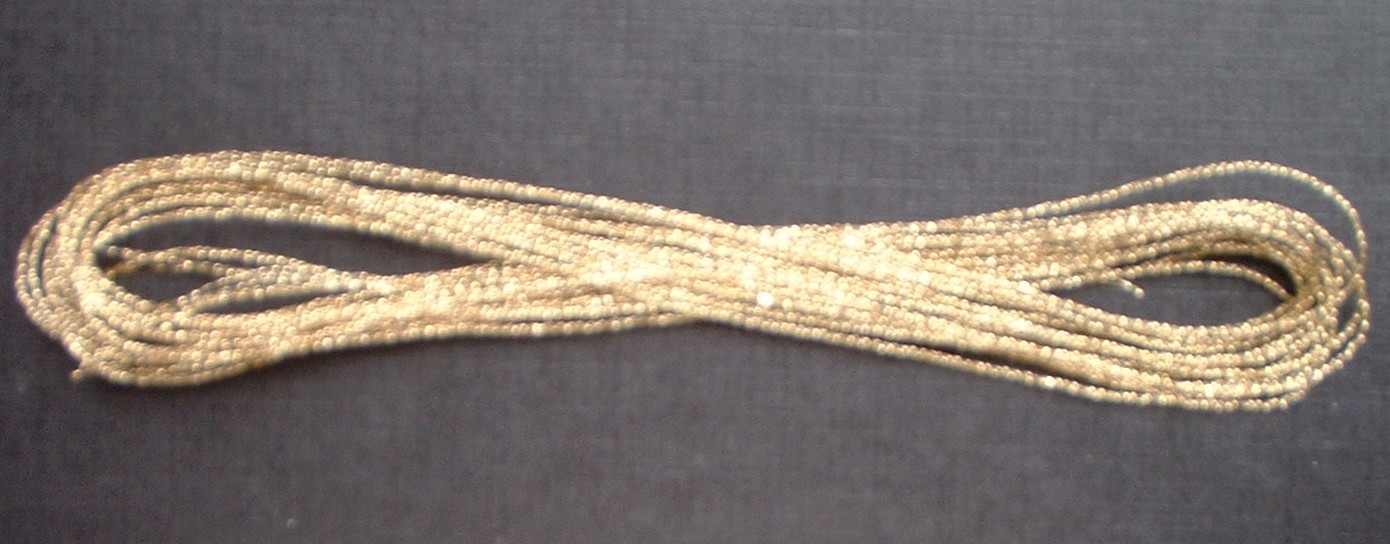
Lurex yarn

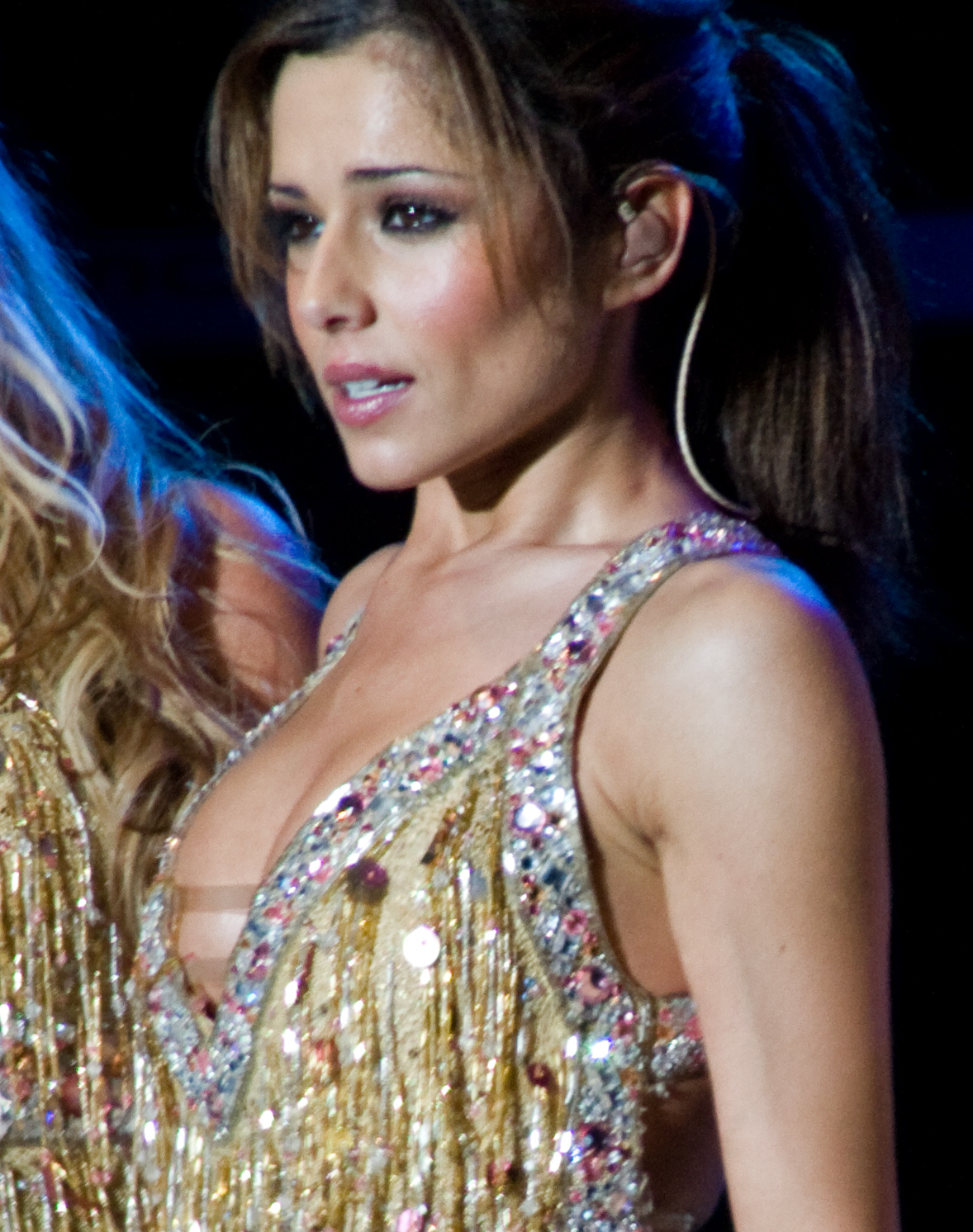
Cheryl Cole wearing a Lurex dress while performing with Girls Aloud at Battle Abbey, Hastings

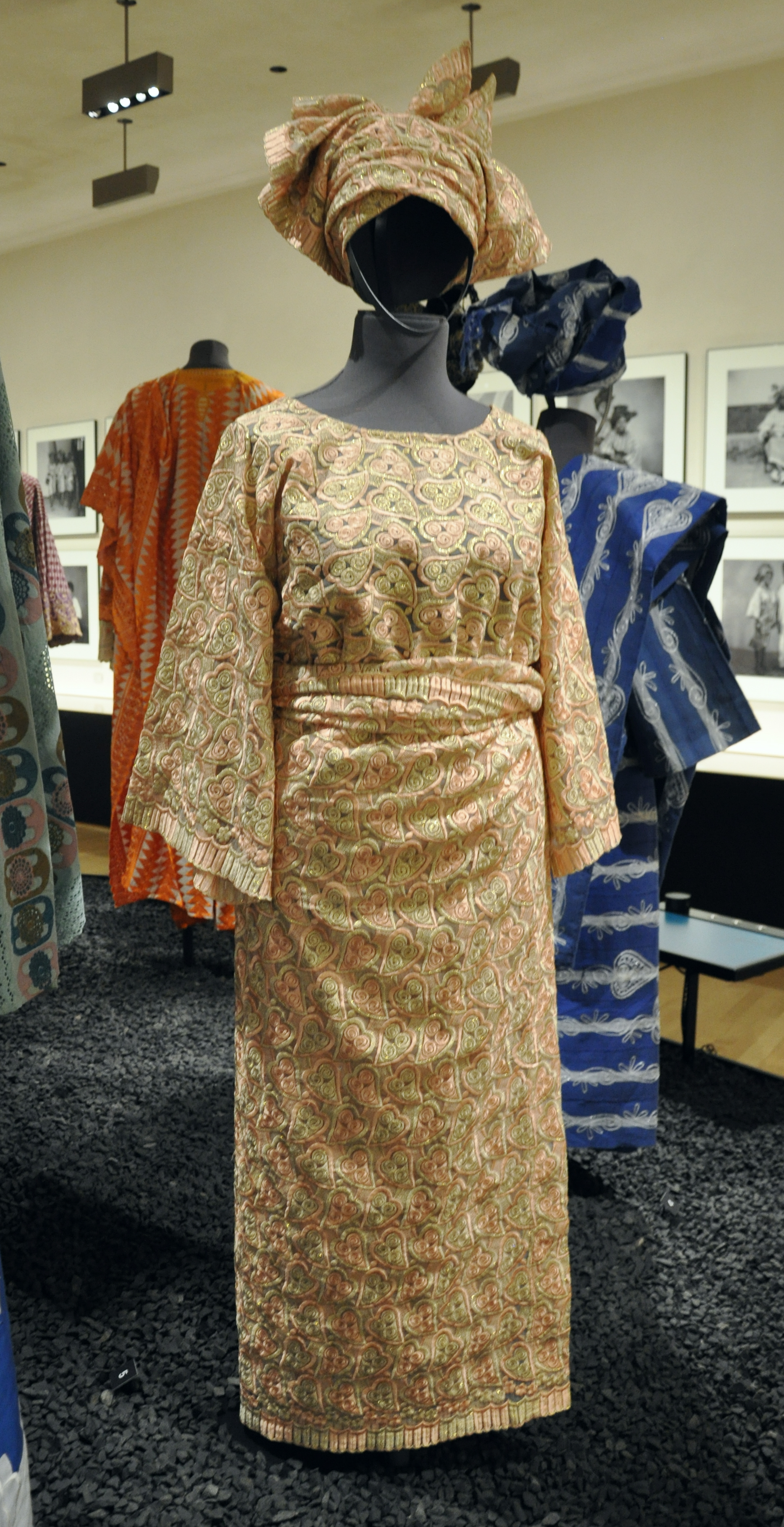
African lace made with Lurex

Lurex is the registered brand name of the Lurex Company, Ltd., for a type of yarn with a metallic appearance. The yarn is made from synthetic film, onto which a metallic aluminium, silver, or gold layer has been vaporized. "Lurex" may also refer to cloth created with the yarn. The word "lurex" is absent from the English language as a common noun: this is the name of the trademark and the company Lurex Company Limited, which launched the production of such yarn based on nylon and polyester—Lurex in the 1970s. The name was based on the English lure—"temptation; attractiveness".

Hugo Wolfram, father of mathematician Stephen Wolfram, served as managing director of the Lurex Company.

== In art and popular culture ==
The bodysuit worn by actress Julie Newmar as Catwoman in the Batman TV series of the 1960s is constructed of black Lurex. In 1973 Queen lead singer Freddie Mercury released a record under the name Larry Lurex, while recording the group's self-titled debut album. He chose the name to parody the stage name of the glam rock singer Gary Glitter. Lurex was mentioned in Australian group AC/DC's song Rocker—"Lurex socks, blue suede shoes, V8 car, and tattoos". Lurex was worn at the 1920s-themed 50th anniversary party for MOMA in New York City in 1979.

== See also ==
- Lamé (fabric)
- Metallic fiber
