= Lianzhou Wang =

Chinese Australian materials scientist

Lianzhou Wang FAA is a Chinese Australian materials scientist and professor in the School of Chemical Engineering at the University of Queensland. He is director of the Nanomaterials Centre (Nanomac) and a senior group member at the Australian Institute for Bioengineering and Nanotechnology at the University of Queensland, as well as a Fellow of the Royal Society of Chemistry.

== Education ==
Wang attended Shandong Polytechnic University in China, where he received a bachelor's degree in materials science and engineering in 1993. He went on to earn a master's degree in materials science and engineering in 1996 from Nanjing University of Technology, China. He married his wife in 1997 and had children.

In 1999, Wang received a PhD in materials science from the Shanghai Institute of Ceramics at the Chinese Academy of Sciences.

== Career ==
In 1999, Wang was awarded a Japan Science and Technology Agency (STA) Fellowship to undertake research at the National Institute of Advanced Industrial Science and Technology (AIST) in Nagoya, Japan, where he investigated low-dimensional semiconductor nanomaterials. In 2001, he was recruited to the National Institute for Materials Science (NIMS) in Tsukuba, Japan, to undertake a postdoctoral fellowship with Takayoshi Sasaki, where he conducted innovative research on the synthesis and characterisation of layered materials and two-dimensional semiconductor nanosheets.

In 2004, Wang was recruited to the ARC Centre of Excellence for Functional Nanomaterials led by Max Lu at the University of Queensland (UQ) in Australia, where, in 2006, he received an Australian Research Council (ARC) Queen Elizabeth II Fellowship and commenced leadership of a multidisciplinary program on self-assembled nanostructures for energy conversion applications. In 2007, he was appointed as a senior lecturer at UQ's School of Chemical Engineering.

In 2010, Wang was appointed as an associate professor in the School of Chemical Engineering and full professor in 2012. Also in 2012, he became director of the Nanomaterials Centre (Nanomac) at the University of Queensland and a Senior Group Leader at the Australian Institute for Bioengineering and Nanotechnology.

Wang is a fellow of Royal Society of Chemistry, as well as a member of the executive committees of the Australian Nanotechnology Network and the National Committee for Materials Science and Engineering of the Australian Academy of Science (AAS). He was appointed as a panel member of the ARC College of Experts in 2016–2018. In 2022, he was elected a foreign member of the Academia Europaea.

== Research ==
Wang is recognised internationally for the design and development of semiconductor nanomaterials for use in cleaner and more efficient solar energy conversion and storage systems, including new photocatalytsts for solar driven hydrogen, valuable chemical production, low cost solar cells, and integrated energy storage systems. He has published over 350 journal papers in nanomaterial and nanotechnology fields. According to Google Scholar, he has an H-Index of 71 and over 17,000 citations [10].

In late 2018, Wang's team broke the efficiency world record of quantum dot solar cells which was recognised in the highly influential Best Research-Cell Efficiencies chart.

== Awards and recognition ==
Wang has been honoured with numerous awards including a Japan Science and Technology Fellowship (1999), Australian Research Council QEII Fellowship of 2006, UQ Foundation Research Excellence Award, Scopus Young Researcher Award 2011 (Engineering and Technology category), ARC Future Fellowship of 2012, Fellow of the Royal Society of Chemistry (2015), Springer's Top Papers Award of 2017 and 2018, UQ Awards for Excellence in Higher Degree by Research Supervision of 2018, and an Australian Laureate Fellowship in 2019. He was elected a Fellow of the Australian Academy of Science in 2024.
