= Punch needle =

Embroidery tool

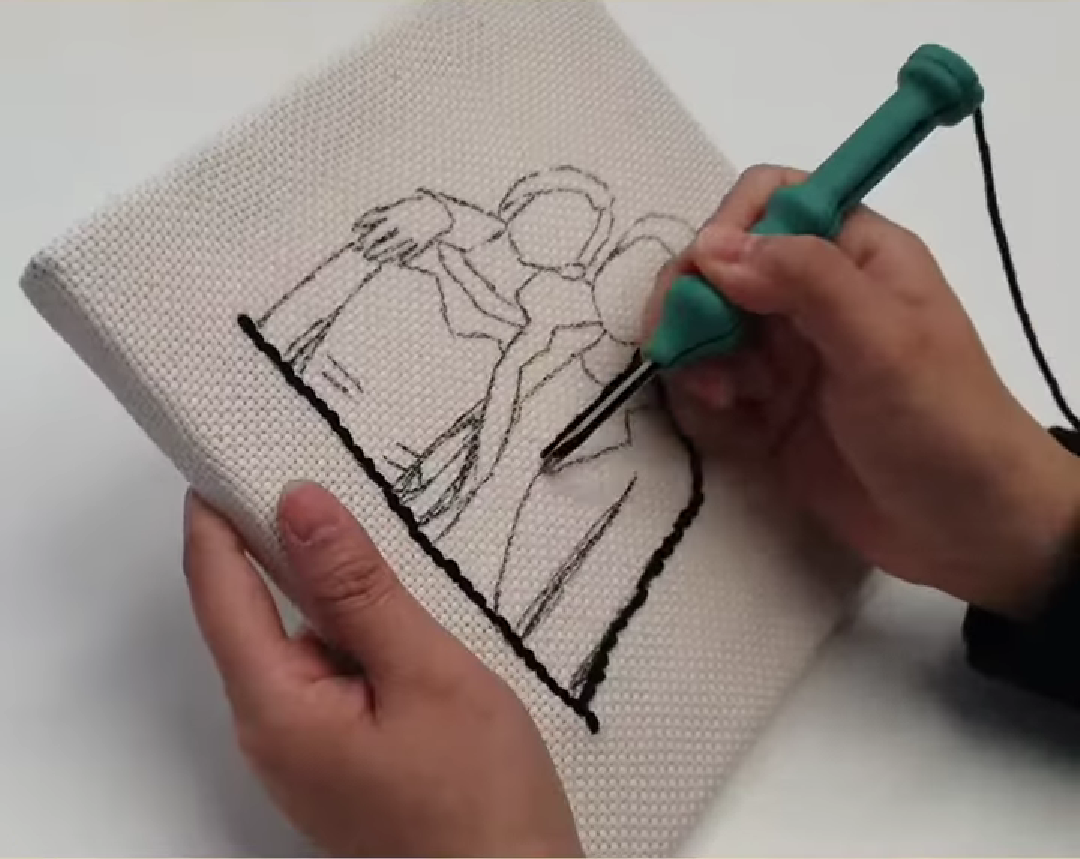
A punch needle being used for decorative embroidery.

A punch needle is a manual tool used for embroidery or rug making that creates a field of tightly packed loops of thread or yarn on a woven fabric substrate. The tool generally consists of a hollow needle with an angled opening attached to a wooden or plastic handle. The needle's eye is drilled just above its tip, rather than at its base, as with most sewing needles. Yarn is threaded through the hollow needle via an opening at the top of its handle, and out through the eye.

A punch needle stitch is made by forcing the needle through the weave of the fabric, creating a loop that is kept in place by friction. The tool is held so that the eye of the needle stays on the opposite side of the direction of the stitch. Punch needle embroidery is typically worked from the back of the fabric. On the other hand, punch needle rug making is usually worked from the back.

Examples of traditional crafting techniques that use punch needles include "New England Style" rug hooking, Russian punch needle embroidery, and Japanese bunka shishu. Mechanical rug tufting, often achieved with a tufting gun, also creates a similar effect to manual punch needling. In 2022, sportswear company Nike announced they would be using punch needle technology to create a more sustainable alternative to fleece.
