= Conrad Wolfram =

British technologist and businessman

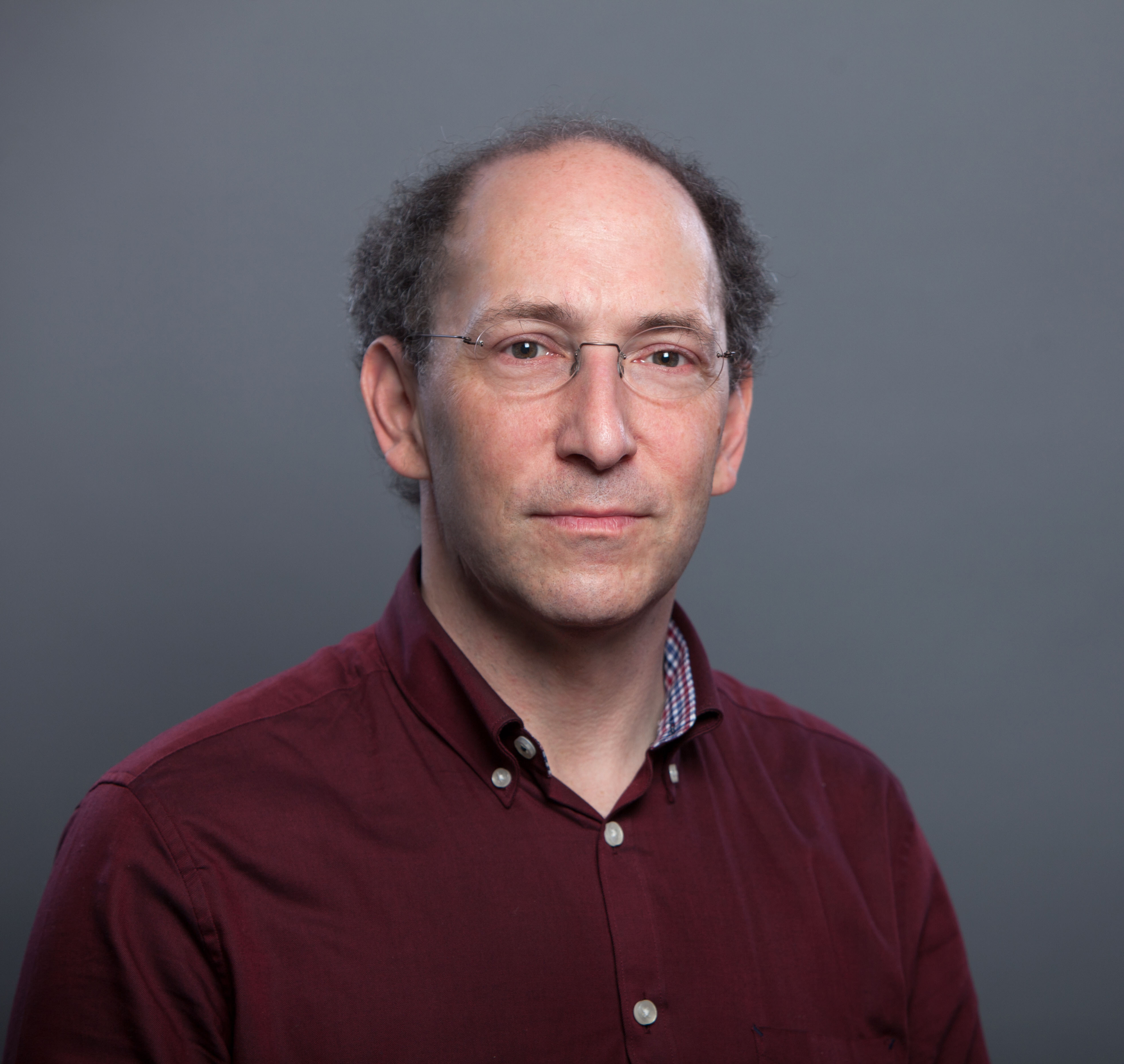
- Portrait of Conrad Wolfram
- Born: 10 June 1970 (age 56); Oxford, England
- Education: Dragon School; Eton College; University of Cambridge (MA)
- Employer: Wolfram Research
- Known for: Computer-Based Math
- Parents: Hugo Wolfram (father); Sybil Wolfram (mother)
- Family: Stephen Wolfram (brother)
- Website: www.conradwolfram.com

Conrad Wolfram (born 10 June 1970) is a British technologist and businessman known for his work in information technology and mathematics education reform. In June 2020, Wolfram released his first book, The Math(s) Fix: An Education Blueprint for the AI Age.

== Education and early life ==
Born in Oxford, England, in 1970, Wolfram was educated at Dragon School and Eton College where he learned to program on a BBC Micro. He was an undergraduate student at Pembroke College, Cambridge where he studied the Natural Sciences tripos graduating with a Master of Arts degree from the University of Cambridge.

== Career ==
Wolfram has been a proponent of Computer-Based Math—a reform of mathematics education to "rebuild the curriculum assuming computers exist." and is the founder of computerbasedmath.org.

He argues, "There are a few cases where it is important to do calculations by hand, but these are small fractions of cases. The rest of the time you should assume that students should use a computer just like everyone does in the real world." And that "School mathematics is very disconnected from mathematics used to solve problems in the real world". In an interview with the Guardian he described the replacement of hand calculation by computer use as "democratising expertise". He argues that "A good guide to how and what you should do with a computer in the classroom is what you'd do with it outside. As much as possible, use real-world tools in the classroom in an open-ended way not special education-only closed-ended approaches."

In 2009, he spoke about education reform at the TEDx Conference at the EU Parliament. and again at TED Global 2010 where he argued that "Maths should be more practical and more conceptual, but less mechanical," and that "Calculating is the machinery of math - a means to an end."

In August 2012, he was a member of the judging panel at the Festival of Code, the culmination of Young Rewired State 2012. Wolfram is also part of Flooved advisory board.

On 10 June 2020, Wolfram released his first book, The Math(s) Fix: An Education Blueprint for the AI Age. The book summarises Wolfram's thoughts on the current state of mathematics education and sets out a vision for a new core subject based on computational thinking.

In October 2021, Wolfram appeared on the *Messy and Masterful* podcast, discussing his Computer-Based Math initiative and stating that “when the automation gets good, you can go much further by doing it on the machine than you can by hand.”

=== Wolfram Research ===
Wolfram co-founded Wolfram Research Europe Ltd. in 1991 and remains its CEO. In 1996, he additionally became Strategic and International Director of Wolfram Research, Inc., making him also responsible for Wolfram Research Asia Ltd, and communications such as the wolfram.com website.

Wolfram Research was founded by his brother Stephen Wolfram, the maker of Mathematica software and the Wolfram Alpha knowledge engine.

Wolfram has led the effort to move the use of Mathematica from pure computation system to development and deployment engine, instigating technology such as the Mathematica Player family and web Mathematica and by pushing greater automation within the system.

He has also led the focus on interactive publishing technology with the stated aim of "making new applications as everyday as new documents" claiming that "If a picture is worth a thousand words, an interactive document is worth a thousand pictures." These technologies converged to form the Computable Document Format which Wolfram says can "transfer knowledge in a much higher-bandwidth way".

== Personal life ==
Wolfram's father Hugo Wolfram was a textile manufacturer and novelist (Into a Neutral Country) and his mother Sybil Wolfram was a professor of philosophy at the University of Oxford. He is the younger brother of Stephen Wolfram.
