= Australian Institute for Bioengineering and Nanotechnology =

Institute of the University of Queensland

Coordinates: 27.500799°S 153.012925°E

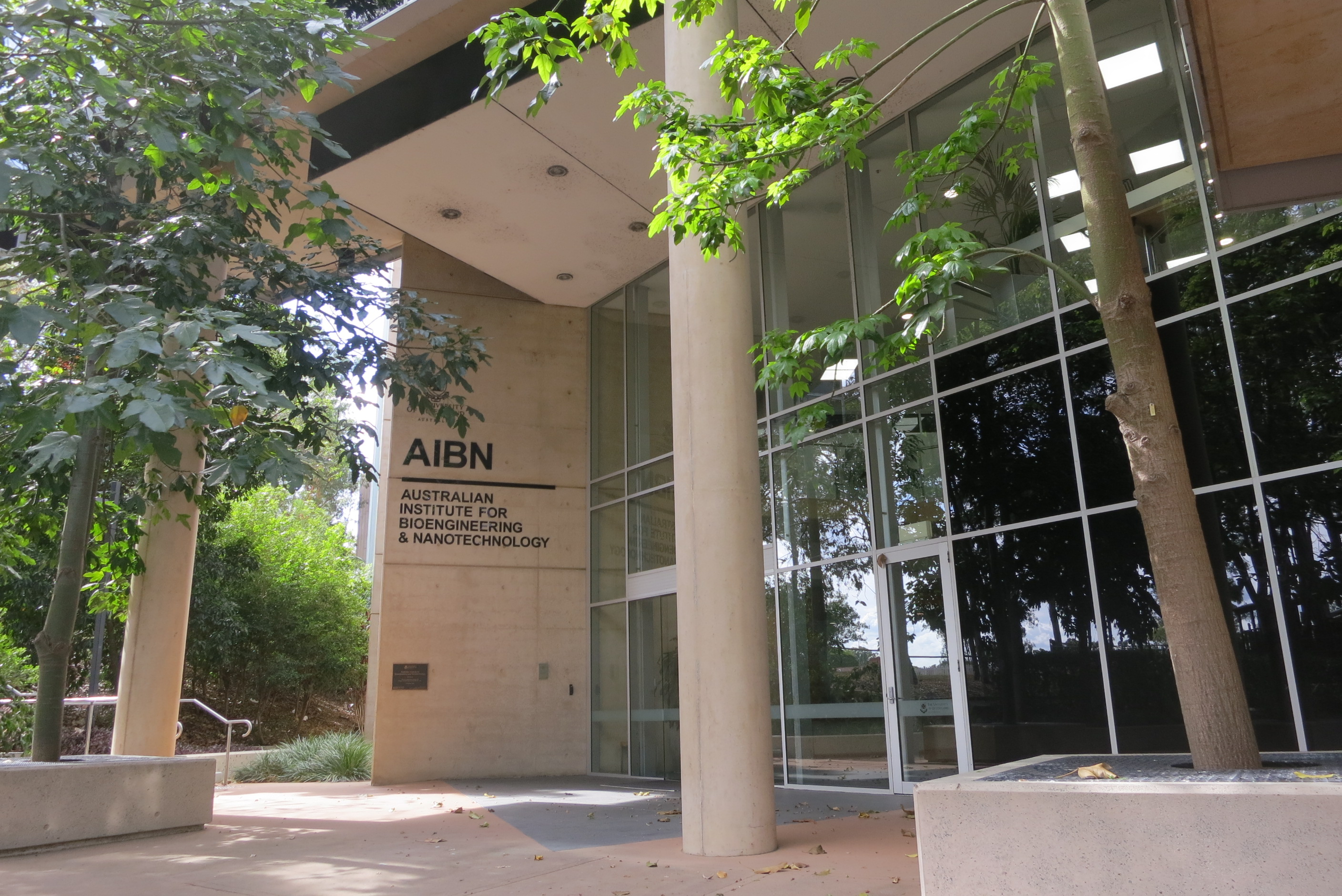
Main entrance of the AIBN

The University of Queensland's Australian Institute for Bioengineering and Nanotechnology (AIBN) was established in 2003. It is one of four stand-alone research institutions at the university with more than 500 researchers, students and support staff. The inaugural Director was Peter Gray (2003 – 2015). The institute's second director, Professor Alan Rowan, commenced in 2016.

The AIBN is an integrated multi-disciplinary research institute bringing together researchers in the areas of bioengineering and nanotechnology. It is home to research groups working at the interface of the biological, chemical and physical sciences, and its applications in human health and environmental issues.

Notable work performed by the institute includes the needleless Nanopatch vaccine delivery device that is ready to begin human trials; local production of an experimental antibody for the treatment of the Hendra virus; and biofuel research.

== Research ==
AIBN's research efforts are focused in the areas of:

- Nanotechnology-based imaging and drug delivery for therapeutic products;
- Regenerative medicine: biology, stem cells and novel scaffolds;
- Novel protein expression utilising metabolomics and systems biotechnology;
- Nanotechnology for energy and environmental applications.

== Facilities ==
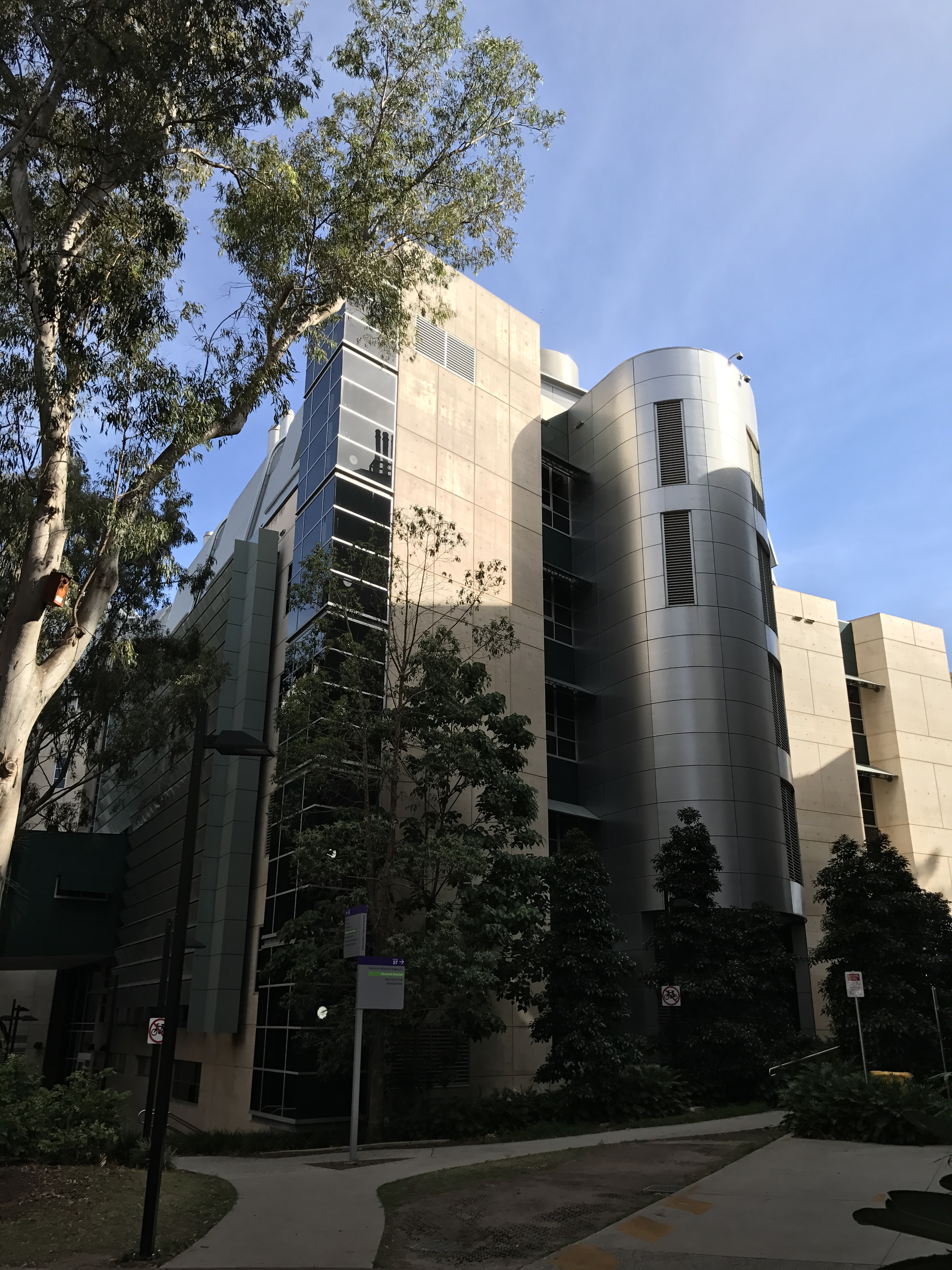

AIBN has been based in a $75 million state-of-the-art research facility since October 2006. The Jackson/S2F Architectural firm designed the building, which possesses 15,700 square metres (169,000 sq ft) of floor space, and comprises PC2 and PC3 biocontainment laboratories.

Specialist facilities in the AIBN include:

- Cell and tissue culture facilities;
- Nanoparticle production and analysis capabilities;
- Polymer Synthesis and Characterisation;
- Microanalysis;
- Ultra-High Performance Flow Cytometry.

== Financial support ==
Financial support of Atlantic Philanthropies, the Government of Queensland and The University of Queensland enabled the construction of the $75 million AIBN research facility.

== Students ==
AIBN counts with over 140 full-time PhD students. Through the AIBN Summer and Winter Research internship programs, the institute provides research experience and laboratory skills to undergraduate students with an interest in research as a potential career. These opportunities provide scope for co-authorship in research publications and pathways into Honours, Masters and PhD research. An AIBN student has won the UQ Three Minute Thesis in 2012.

== Industrial and business ==
The Institute has set up an Industrial Affiliates Program to tackle technological issues confronting the industry.

AIBN has established products and created companies based on the technology developed within it. Four start-up companies currently operate largely or exclusively out of AIBN. Institute researchers founded three companies to develop AIBN technology – Vaxxas Pty Ltd (vaccine delivery), TenasiTech Pty Ltd (bio-plastics), and Pepfactants Pty Ltd – while Acyte, founded by AIBN Director Professor Peter Gray, was brought to AIBN from The University of New South Wales.

The start-up companies are distinct entities, with their own management structures, boards and finances. AIBN provides facilities, equipment and, through The University of Queensland's commercialisation company UniQuest, a level of specialist support, such as management of patents and commercial advice.

== Notable people ==
Joy Wolfram, Lianzhou Wang, Yusuke Yamauchi
