= Hugo Wolfram =

English businessman and novelist

- Born: 1925; Bochum, Germany
- Died: 15 September 2015 (aged 90); Oxford, England
- Known for: Businessman
- Spouse: Sybil Misch
- Children: Stephen Wolfram; Conrad Wolfram

Hugo Wolfram (/ˈwʊlfrəm/ WUUL-frəm; 1925 – 15 September 2015) was an English businessman and novelist, of German Jewish origin. He served as managing director of the Lurex Company, makers of Lurex (registered trade mark) metallic yarns and thread and was the author of three novels including Into a Neutral Country, a psychological novel about the experience of refugees and the predicament of "displaced persons".

== Biography ==
Hugo Wolfram was born in Germany, emigrating to England in 1933. When World War II broke out, young Hugo left school at 15 and subsequently found it hard to get a job since he was an enemy alien. As an adult, he took correspondence courses in philosophy and psychology.

He was the father of computer scientist Stephen Wolfram and British technologist and businessman Conrad Wolfram.
