= Sybil Wolfram =

English philosopher and writer

- Born: Sybille Misch; 1 July 1931; Berlin
- Died: 26 July 1993 (aged 62)
- Occupation: Philosopher
- Spouse: Hugo Wolfram
- Children: Stephen Wolfram, Conrad Wolfram
- Mother: Kate Friedlander

Sybil Wolfram (born Sybille Misch; 1 July 1931 – 26 July 1993) was an English philosopher and writer, of Austrian Jewish origin. She studied at Somerville College, Oxford and was a Fellow and Tutor in philosophy at Lady Margaret Hall at University of Oxford from 1964 to 1993.

== Work ==
She published two books, Philosophical Logic: An Introduction (1989) and In-laws and Outlaws: Kinship and Marriage in England (1987). She was the translator of Claude Lévi-Strauss's La pensée sauvage (The Savage Mind), but later disavowed the translation when she discovered the publisher had made changes to the translation that neither she nor Lévi-Strauss had authorized.

== Personal life ==
She was the daughter of criminologist and psychoanalyst Kate Friedlander (1902–1949), an expert on the subject of juvenile delinquency, and the physician Walter Misch (1889–1943) who, together, wrote Die vegetative Genese der neurotischen Angst und ihre medikamentöse Beseitigung. After the Reichstag fire in 1933, she emigrated from Berlin, Germany to England with her parents.

She was the mother of computer scientist Stephen Wolfram and British technologist and businessman Conrad Wolfram.

== See also ==
- Particular
- Truth-bearer
