= Maria Wolfram =

Finnish artist (born 1961)

- Born: 24 August 1961; Helsinki, Finland
- Education: Kingston University; Chelsea College of Art and Design

Maria Wolfram (born 24 August 1961) is a Finnish visual artist. She is known for creating art that is viewed through the female perspective.

== Education and career ==
Wolfram enrolled at art school Vapaa Taidekoulu to study painting. She attended Berkshire College of Art and Design in the UK and obtained a foundation diploma in art. Wolfram earned a bachelor's degree in Fine Arts from Kingston University. She obtained her master's from Chelsea College of Art and Design in London.

Wolfram began exhibiting in 1998. Since then, she has participated in many art fairs and festivals around the world. Wolfram has held solo exhibitions outside Finland, namely in Japan, Belgium, Sweden etc. She had worked as an artist-in-residence at the Finnish Institute in Athens, among others.

Wolfram began tutoring art under vocational and technical school, Axxell City, in 2011. She held governing positions in several Finnish art organizations. She is a member of several art associations in Finland, such as the Taidemaalariliitto (Finnish Painters’ Union).

Wolfram is a recipient of many awards and grants in England and in Finland. In 2018, she received a project award from Konstsamfundet rf and Svenska Kulturfonden.

== Art ==
Wolfram is a painter and installation artist. She creates art with a contemporary approach, valuing elements such as experimentation and materiality. Wolfram uses mixed materials such as stockings, feathers and various textiles on her sculpture; she would mix oil, acrylic and ink, although she often uses oil in painting.

Wolfram exhibits large-scale oil paintings on wooden panels. She likes to delve in narrative painting – where feminism, identity and power are recurring topics. She takes inspiration from folklore and mythology, and she is interested in the interpretation of history from different cultures. Fueled by the insufficient coverage of women's contributions throughout history, she creates art that is viewed through the female perspective.

== Selected works ==
- In the Shadow of Corona
- Sisters are Doing it
- Reunion
- Lady Huntington
- There's Always be a Sister Somewhere
- The Townhall Meeting
- All-Kind-of-Ballerinas
- Miniatyrri 1
- Walk with me
- What if Rembrandt had been Rembrandtina
- The Scent of Snow

== Selected exhibitions ==
=== Solo ===
- 2004 – “Meetings”, Hanasaaren Kulttuurikeskus, Helsinki, Finland
- 2010 – “Oversea Spotted”, Water Institute Gallery, Tel Aviv, Israel
- 2011 – “There is Room”, Galleria Huuto, Helsinki, Finland
- 2011 – "Surface and Undercurrents", Kulturcentrum Korpoström, Pargas, Finland
- 2013 – "Merry Go Around", Galleria Katariina, Helsinki, Finland
- 2014 – "Among Us", KuKuk V.o.G, Raeven, Belgium
- 2019 – Art Goes Kapakka Festival, Helsinki, Finland
- 2019 – "Almost Touching the Stars", Ars Gallery, Tokyo, Japan
- 2020 – "Pow Wow", Galleria Saskia, Tampere, Finland
- 2023 – "Face to face", Helsinki, Finland

=== Group ===
- 1998 – Kingston University, London, United Kingdom
- 1999 – Stanley Picker Gallery, London, United Kingdom
- 2013 – "OpenArt 2013", Örebro, Sweden
- 2015 – "NordArt", Budelsdorf, Germany
- 2016 – "Our Fukishima", National Institution Museum, Kumanovo, Macedonia
- 2017 – "Silence and Echo", Vestjylland Art Museum, Tistrup, Denmark
- 2018 – "The Finnish Illusion" (with Katja Tukiainen and Llona Cutts), Spruill Gallery, Atlanta, USA
- 2019 – "World Art Tokyo" (Representative of Finland), Tokyo, Japan
- 2019 – "Personal Structures", Venice, Italy

== Selected collections ==
- Imago Mundi Luciano Benetton Collection
- The Finnish State's Art Collection, Finland
- Vattenfalls Konstförening rf., Sweden.
- German-Finnish Chamber of Commerce, Finland
- Ameco International Ltd (British Petrol), United Kingdom
