= Luben.tv =

Greek satire website

Luben.tv is a Greek website known for its critique and satire of political and social news in Greece, as well as public figures. Established in 2010 by two students from the School of Electrical and Computer Engineering at the Technical University of Crete, the platform derives its name from the German term "lumpen," meaning "rag."

The website reportedly receives approximately 1.5 million monthly views and has about 600,000 unique users. Demographically, about 50% of Luben.tv's audience falls within the 25-34 age group, with approximately 28% being users aged 18-24. The platform's YouTube channel claims over 500,000 registered users, with some videos amassing more than 2 million views. Additionally, Luben.tv boasts a substantial social media presence, with over 800,000 followers on Facebook and 600,000 on Instagram.

Luben.tv has received acknowledgment from various quarters. Prime Minister Kyriakos Mitsotakis remarked that the platform is "doing an interesting job." Additionally, traditional media outlets like the Kathimerini daily newspaper have noted its presence and influence in the Greek media landscape.
