= List of most popular social platforms =

Popular social apps with usage numbers and other metrics

This is a list of social platforms with at least 100 million monthly active users. (Note: When monthly active users is not available, it is estimated to be more than 100 million based on other metrics.) The list includes social networks, as well as online forums, photo and video sharing platforms, messaging and VoIP apps.

== List ==
Name	Company	Country (Note: Indicates platform's current headquarters. Might be different from the country where platform was founded, or headquarters of parent company.)	Launched	Monthly active users	Other metrics
Facebook	Meta Platforms	United States	2004	3.070 billion	
YouTube	Alphabet Inc.	United States	2005	2.504 billion	3 billion users
WhatsApp	Meta Platforms	United States	2009	2 billion	Had 1 billion daily active users when it had 1.3 billion monthly active users
Instagram	Meta Platforms	United States	2010	3 billion	
TikTok	ByteDance	China	2016	1.582 billion	
WeChat	Tencent	China	2011	1.343 billion	
Messenger	Meta Platforms	United States	2011	1.01 billion	
Telegram	Telegram	UAE	2013	1 billion	
LinkedIn	Microsoft	United States	2003	930 million	700 million registered users
Snapchat	Snap Inc.	United States	2011	900 million	460 million daily active users
Reddit	Reddit	United States	2005	760 million	101.7 million daily active users, 380 million weekly active users
Douyin	ByteDance	China	2016	755 million	
Kuaishou	Kuaishou	China	2011	700 million	
Weibo	Sina Corporation	China	2009	586 million	241 million daily active users
Pinterest	Pinterest	United States	2009	570 million	98 million U.S. monthly active users
X	SpaceXAI	United States	2006	540-570 million	
QQ	Tencent	China	1999	554 million	267 million daily active users
Qzone	Tencent	China	2005	517 million	
Threads	Meta Platforms	United States	2023	500 million	
Quora	Quora	United States	2009	400 million	
Bilibili	Bilibili	China	2009	376 million	
Xiaohongshu	Xingyin Information Technology	China	2013	300 million	
JOSH	VerSe Innovation	India	2020	300 million	
Teams	Microsoft	United States	2017	300 million	145 million daily active users
Tieba	Baidu	China	2003	300 million	1500 million registered users
Viber	Rakuten	Japan	2010	260 million	1.169 billion registered users
imo	Singularity IM	United States	2007	200 million	
Discord	Discord	United States	2015	200 million	
Twitch	Amazon	United States	2011	180 million	
Line	Naver	Japan	2011	178 million	
Likee	JOYY	Singapore	2017	150 million	
Picsart	Picsart	Armenia	2011	150 million	
Vevo	Vevo	United States	2009	150 million	
Tumblr	Automattic	United States	2007	135 million	
Signal	Signal	United States	2014	100 million	
Life360	Life360	United States	2008	100 million	

== Integrated services ==
No.	Name	Company	Country	Launched	Monthly active users	Other metrics
1.	Zoom	Zoom Video Communications	United States	2012		300 million daily participants
2.	Meet	Alphabet Inc.	United States	2017		100 million daily participants
3.	iMessage	Apple Inc.	United States	2011		1.4 billion active Apple devices
4.	FaceTime	Apple Inc.	United States	2011		1.4 billion active Apple devices

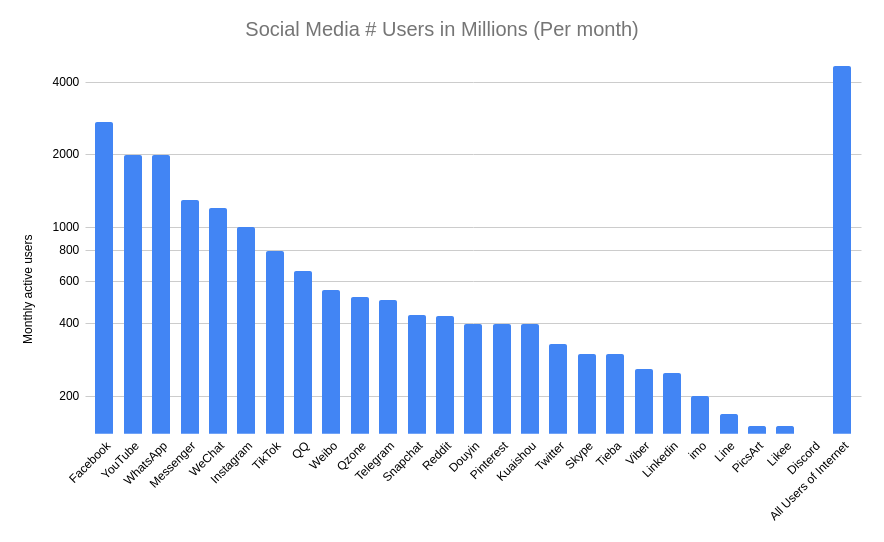
Social Media Users per Month compared to All Users on Internet, as of 2020

== See also ==
- List of most-visited websites
- List of social networking services
