= Creative sequencing =

Concept in advertising

Creative sequencing is a term in advertising that means predefining a particular sequence (sequencing) of a series of creatives (creative), usually under the same creative concept, that a unique visitor will watch when the visitor visits multiple web pages. The particular sequence is applied to all websites that serve ads from the same ad network.

Creative sequencing is a feature within ad serving that allows to predefine the sequence of creatives a unique visitor will watch. For example, if an advertiser has 3 creatives A, B and C to deliver to its target audiences, then the advertiser may set the sequence that audiences will watch the 3 creatives as following:

- Iteration as A-B-C-A-B-C-A-B-C...
- Some specific sequence as A-A-B-B-C-C-A-A-B-B...
- Randomly serve the creatives as A-C-A-B-B-C-C-A...The advertiser can set specific weight for each creative under the random sequence model, e.g.: 40% for creative A, 30% for creative B and 30% for creative C.

This feature uses cookies to remember creatives that a unique visitor has watched and to decide which creative to be served to the unique visitor next time.
