= Highstreetmail =

The Highstreetmail
- Type: Daily newspaper
- Format: Online newspaper
- Owner: Highstreetmail Communications
- Publisher: Highstreetmail Media
- Staff writers: 25 news department staff
- Founded: 2012; 14 years ago
- Headquarters: The Highstreetmail; P. O. Box KN 6113; Accra, Ghana, West Africa
- Price: US$2 Monday-Saturday; US$5 Sunday/Thanksgiving Day; US$5/6 Special Editions
- Website: highstreetmail.com

The Highstreetmail (HSM) is a Ghanaian daily online newspaper, founded and continuously published in Accra since 2012. Its website is Ghana's most popular online news site, receiving more than 250,000 unique visitors per month.
