= Imo.im =

Instant messaging software service

imo
- Developers: Pagebites, Inc.
- Release: April 2007; 19 years ago
- Operating system: Cross-platform
- Type: Instant messaging
- License: Proprietary
- Website: imo.im

imo.im is a proprietary audio/video calling and instant messaging software service. It allows sending music, video, PDFs and other files, along with various free stickers. It supports encrypted group video and voice calls with up to 20 participants. The app adjusts call quality to help maintain voice and video calls on slow or unstable internet connections. According to its developer, imo has over 200 million users across more than 170 countries and supports 62 languages. In January 2018, the app reached 500 million installs. In 2025, imo ranked fourth among social apps by downloads in the United Arab Emirates and fifth in Saudi Arabia.

== History ==
The product was created as a web-based application in 2005 for accessing multiple chat platforms, including Facebook Messenger, Google Talk, Yahoo! Messenger, and Skype chat. It was developed by Pagebites, which is a subsidiary of Singularity IM, Inc., and required a subscriber's phone number to verify the user's account. In March 2014, support for all third-party messaging networks ended.

In 2021, imo launched VoiceClub, a platform for real-time voice chats. In April 2026, imo launched a web version that allows users to log in by scanning a QR code or using their phone number.

imo supports end-to-end encryption for chats and calls.

== See also ==
- List of social platforms with at least 100 million active users
