= Active Intelligence Pte Ltd =

Private fintech company

Active Intelligence Pte Ltd (Active.Ai)
- Type: Private
- Industry: artificial intelligence
- Founded: February 2016; 10 years ago
- Founders: Ravi Shankar; Parikshit Paspulati; Shankar Narayanan
- Headquarters: Singapore, Singapore
- Key people: Ravi Shankar (CEO); Parikshit Paspulati (CTO) Shankar Narayanan (COO)
- Products: Morfeus; Triniti
- Number of employees: ▲65 (November 2017)
- Parent: Gupshup
- Website: https://www.active.ai

Active Intelligence Pte Ltd (Active.Ai) is a private fintech company focusing on artificial intelligence. Its headquarters are in Singapore while its research and development base in Bengaluru. It claims to use natural language processing and machine intelligence as a platform that allows banks to interact with customers using messaging and voice.

Active.Ai was founded by Ravi Shankar, a former Group Executive Vice President at Yes Bank, Shankar Narayanan, and Parikshit Paspulati in 2016.

Active.Ai raised $3 million from ID Ventures India and Kalaari Capital in November 2016. It raised $8.25 million in series A round of funding, co-led by Vertex Ventures, Creditease Holdings and Dream Incubator in November 2017.

== Products ==
=== Morfeus ===
Morfeus is Active Ai's middleware engine that runs as the Java app on a typical web server. It provides a web interface for configuration and management, connecting front-end channels that helps banks to engage with their customers over unstructured micro-conversations via mobile, chat or voice enabled IOT devices using artificial intelligence. Morfeus was developed with assistance of the company's innovation lab in Bangalore India.

=== Triniti ===
Triniti is an AI engine composed of natural language processing and natural language generation elements enabling financial institutions to connect with customers in a natural format over messaging, voice and IOT devices. Triniti is also designed for banks to automate certain functions including transactions and customer service between customers and other banks.
