= Meta Portal =

Line of smart displays by Facebook

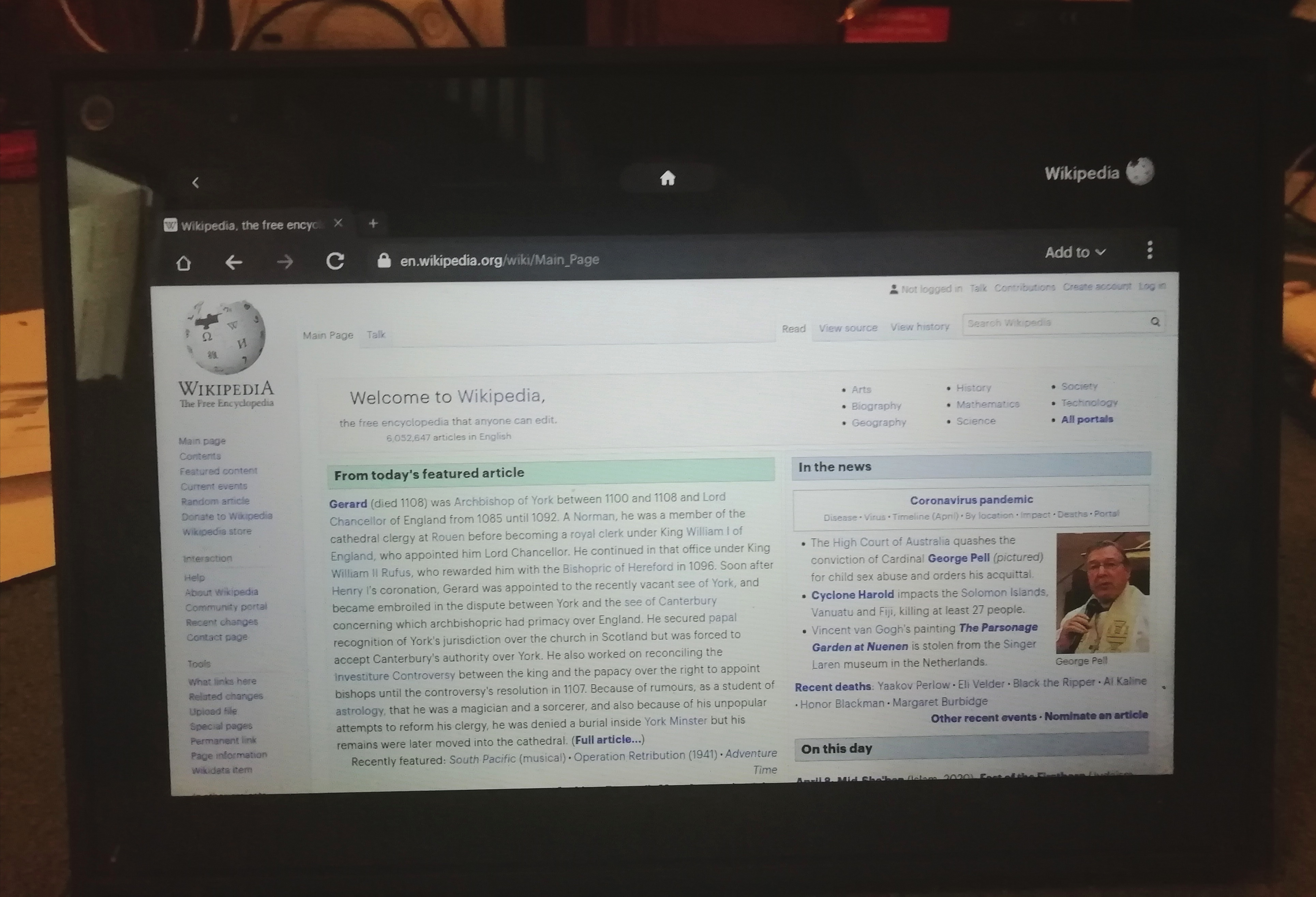
- Main page of the English Wikipedia displayed on a Meta Portal Mini
- Developer: Meta Platforms
- Manufacturer: Meta Platforms
- Type: Smart display
- Released: November 8, 2018; 7 years ago
- Operating system: Android-based
- Input: Voice commands
- Website: meta.com/portal/

Meta Portal (also known as Portal) is a discontinued brand of smart displays and videophones released in 2018 by Meta. The product line consists of four models: Portal, Portal+, Portal TV, and Portal Go. These models provide video chat via Messenger and WhatsApp, augmented by a camera that can automatically zoom and track people's movements. The devices are integrated with Amazon's voice-controlled intelligent personal assistant service Alexa.

Reviewers rated the Portal line's video and audio handling capabilities positively, but criticized Facebook's privacy practices for commercial use of data that Portal devices captured. Meta uses some data collected from Portal devices for targeted advertising, which reviewers cited as a privacy drawback.

== History ==
On October 8, 2018, Facebook, Inc. announced the sale and shipment of the 10.1-inch (25.7 cm) Portal and the 15.6-inch (39.6 cm) Portal Plus. The second generation of Portal devices was announced on September 18, 2019; the second-generation Portal and Portal Mini were released on October 15, while Portal TV was released on November 5. On September 21, 2021, Facebook announced 2 new devices, a battery powered 10-inch device called "Portal Go" and a new generation of the 14-inch device called "Portal+".

In June 2022, it was reported that Meta was preparing to phase out Portal as a consumer product and instead focus on the enterprise market.

Later, in November 2022, it was reported that Meta would discontinue both its Portal and two remaining unreleased smartwatches. This came after Meta cut some 11,000 jobs at the company as a cost cutting measure.

== Devices ==
=== Portal ===
Portal was the original 10.1-inch (25.7 cm) device released in 2018. The second generation device in 2019 also supported portrait orientation, which was much more convenient when video calling someone on a smart phone, typically held in portrait orientation.

=== Portal+ ===
The original 15.6-inch (39.6 cm) Portal+ was released in 2018 alongside the smaller Portal. This product was not upgraded in the 2019 releases. In 2021, a slightly smaller 14-inch (35.6 cm) new Portal+ was released which, like the previous version, is fixed in landscape orientation but has a mechanism to tilt the screen.

=== Portal Mini ===
Portal Mini was introduced in 2019 alongside the second generation Portal. It was a similar form factor allowing use in either portrait or landscape orientation. The Mini was discontinued after the 2021 release cycle.

Specification	Type
Operating System	Android 10
CPU	Qualcomm ARMv8.2-A Cortex-A75 QCS605 8-core (6xKryo 385 Silver @ 1.7GHz + 2xKryo 385 Gold @ 2.5 GHz)
RAM	3 GB LPDDR4X 1866 MHz
GPU	Adreno 615
Screen	8 inch 1280x800 LED
Storage	8 GB
Connectivity	WiFi 5, Bluetooth 5.0, USB-C (behind speaker grille)

=== Portal TV ===
Portal TV was released in September 2019 alongside the second generation portal. This device has a form factor similar to the Microsoft Kinect with a built in camera and microphone but no display. It connects to a TV, enabling the TV to have features similar to other devices in the Portal family.

=== Portal Go ===
Portal Go was first introduced in Fall 2021. This 10.1-inch (25.7 cm) device is a similar design to the first generation Portal only offering landscape mode. This is the first battery powered Portal device allowing the user to remove it from the charging cradle and relocate it to other locations without powering down.

=== Portal for Business ===
Portal for Business is a software package announced in fall 2021 that allows any of the portal devices to operate as conference room machines, supporting various third-party calling platforms as well as ties into business applications such as calendar.

== Privacy ==
According to Facebook, the Portal devices only record audio after the user speaks the "Hey Portal" command, and only record video during video calling sessions. Each Portal device also includes a cover that can be slid over the camera when not in use.

During the product announcement, Facebook initially claimed that data obtained from Portal devices would not be used for targeted advertising. One week after the announcement, Facebook changed its position and stated that "usage data such as length of calls, frequency of calls" and "general usage data, such as aggregate usage of apps, etc., may also feed into the information that we use to serve ads". The company later clarified that it analyzes the metadata, not the content, of video calls made through Portal devices.

== Marketing ==
Meta spent a significant amount of money on promoting and marketing the Portal, for example spending $48.6 million in US TV ads over 6-weeks in late 2018. They started using the Muppets in September 2019, with characters like Kermit, Miss Piggy and others appearing in their TV ads.

Meta focused on a number of key features in promoting the products, in particular the Smart Camera function that automatically tracked people during calls, and entertainment and assistant features like Alexa built-in, and Facebook Watch (for co-watching videos), as well as other entertainment platforms like Spotify and Netflix added over time.

== Reception ==
=== Critical reception ===
==== First generation ====
Dan Seifert of The Verge found the video and audio quality of Portal's video calling feature via Facebook Messenger to be better than that of competing devices and videotelephony services, but said that "Outside of video calling, the Portal's functionality is rather limited." In light of the Facebook–Cambridge Analytica data scandal, he expressed concerns that the product is "always-watching and always-listening". Megan Wollerton of CNET praised the device's autotracking wide-angle cameras, which allow the subject to remain centered in the device's field of view. Wollerton also had reservations regarding Facebook's privacy policy in relation to Portal's video calls and wrote, "a spokesperson told us that Facebook will, in fact, track information about calls made via Portal to expand on the user profiles it uses to inform ads that show up elsewhere."

In a PC Magazine review, Sascha Segan said, "From a purely technical standpoint, this is by far the best video calling appliance we've seen", and believed that Portal would be a good complement for remote workers if it gains integration with Workplace by Facebook, a feature that is not yet released. However, Segan considered Portal a "horror" from "a policy and privacy perspective" because of the "massive abuses of data on Facebook's consumer platform". Writing for Tom's Guide, Mike Prospero and Monica Chin criticized the "large and obtrusive" size of the display, characterizing it as "dystopian" and "more at home in a Black Mirror episode than in my living room or kitchen". The reviewers echoed "Ongoing privacy concerns", but presented a favorable impression of Portal's automatic panning and audio quality.

==== Second generation ====
In Engadget, Nicole Lee complimented the second-generation Portal's subdued appearance and ability to be used in both portrait and landscape orientations. Adrienne So of Wired highlighted Portal's video tracking and augmented reality features, but denounced Facebook's inclination to "default to sharing more, not less".

Segan's review of the Portal TV in PC Magazine contrasted the device's competitive video calling capabilities with its "thin" support for streaming media services, and criticized Facebook's data security record. In a negative CNET review, Wollerton stated that the Portal TV is "a solidly performing, decently priced device that just isn't suited for anyone because of the privacy concerns and increasingly alarming issues" affecting Facebook.

=== Reviews posted on Amazon by Facebook employees ===
On January 17, 2019, The New York Times columnist Kevin Roose posted on Twitter that Facebook Portal's Amazon product listing contained five-star reviews that appeared to have been written by Facebook employees, including one who claimed to have "historically not been a big Facebook or other social media user" before purchasing Portal. These reviews were written in violation of Amazon's community guidelines, which forbid "creating, modifying, or posting content regarding your (or your relative's, close friend's, business associate's, or employer's) products or services". In response, Facebook's augmented and virtual-reality vice president Andrew Bosworth stated that the reviews were "neither coordinated nor directed from the company" and indicated that Facebook would instruct the employees to remove them.

== Discontinuation ==
In June 2022, Meta announced that they would no longer sell Portal products. Meta report on their support page people can continue to use their Meta Portal until February 2032, however many of the services and apps on the devices are reportedly being phased out much earlier.
