= Gupshup =

American messaging platform

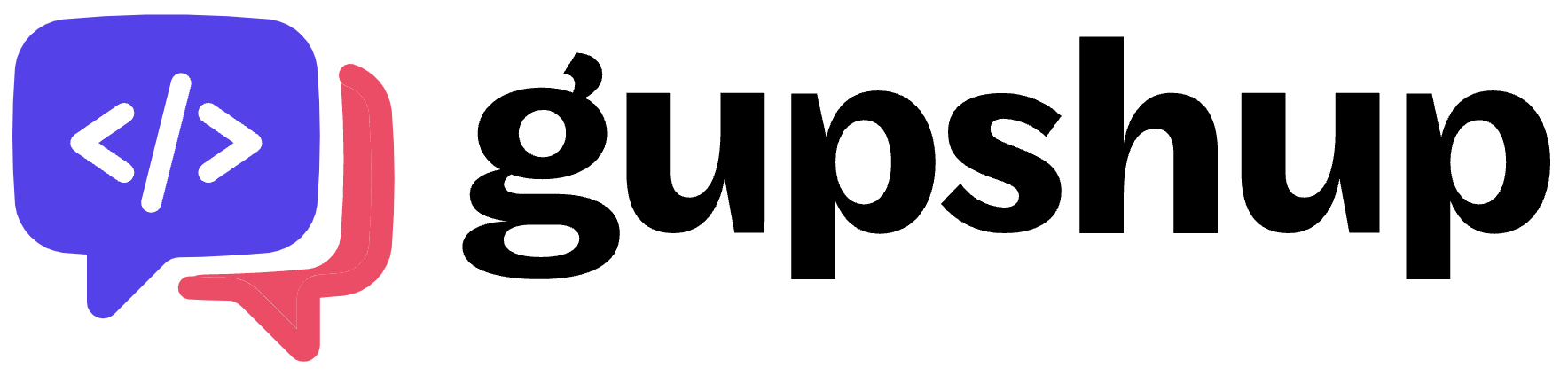
- Type: Private company
- Industry: Software
- Founder: Beerud Sheth
- Headquarters: San Francisco, California
- Key people: Beerud Sheth (CEO)
- Products: Chatbots; SMS; WhatsApp Business API; RCS; Omnichannel messaging Voice; Instagram Messenger API; AI Agent; Conversational AI
- Website: gupshup.io

Gupshup is an American messaging platform for businesses to communicate. With primary operations in India, United States, Europe, Latin America, Africa, Middle East and South East Asia. It is owned and operated by Webaroo Inc.

The company provides Messaging, Voice, Video, USSD and IP messaging, and chatbot development services to BFSI (banking, financial services and insurance), retail, e-commerce, Fintech, EdTech, Healthcare and Media & Entertainment companies.

== History ==
Gupshup was founded in 2004 by Beerud Sheth as an SMS network in India, and is headquartered in Cupertino, California.

Gupshup developed the messaging app Teamchat, which introduced "smart" messages in 2014.

In 2015, the multi-channel serverless bot platform went live. In 2016, Gupshup launched a partnership with FBM, and launched APIs for Slack, Telegram, and introduced their bot platform and bot builder tools.

In 2017, the company was one of the earliest global partners of WhatsApp. The company also launched InterBot, a platform enabling bot-to-bot communication, allowing bots to transact, coordinate, and collaborate with each other. Additionally, Gupshup developed chatbots compatible with platforms like Google Assistant and Amazon Alexa. In 2018, Gupshup partnered with leading handset OEMs.

In 2020, the company launched its own IP Messaging channel - Gupshup IP Messaging, aka GIP.

In April 2021, Gupshup raised a $100 million Series F funding round led by Tiger Global at a valuation of $1.4 billion, becoming a unicorn. The platform was used by more than 100,000 businesses and developers. In July 2021, it raised an additional $240 million. Gupshup achieved unicorn status in April 2021, joining the ranks of startup companies valued at over $1 billion.

=== Acquisitions ===
- In September 2021, Gupshup acquired DOTGO, a rich communications system (RCS) business messaging (RBM) player based in New Jersey.
- In April 2022, Gupshup acquired Active.ai, a conversational AI platform for banks and Fintech companies.

== Awards and recognition ==
Gupshup has been recognized by several industry analyst firms for its conversational AI and messaging capabilities.

In 2023, IDC MarketScape positioned Gupshup as a "Major Player" in its "Worldwide Communications Platform as a Service Vendor Assessment" (document #US50607923), noting the company's AI-driven engagement capabilities within the CPaaS market.

In October 2023, Everest Group recognized Gupshup as a "Major Contender" in its "Conversational AI Products PEAK Matrix® Assessment 2023".

== Technology ==
In April 2016, Gupshup launched one of the first chatbot building platforms. As of September 2017, the company has over 30,000 chatbots across 22 channels, like Facebook Messenger, SMS, Twitter, Hangouts, Google Home, Amazon Alexa, WeChat, Skype, Microsoft Teams, and email.

In March 2023, Gupshup launched a generative AI platform called Auto Bot Builder, which uses large language models (LLMs) to automate chatbot creation by generating conversational flows from website URLs or documentation.

In July 2023, Gupshup integrated Meta's Llama 2 large language model into its platform, becoming an early partner for Meta's AI technology. This integration expanded the platform's natural language processing capabilities.

=== Messaging and Conversation Orchestration ===
Gupshup's technology includes conversation orchestration capabilities that manage multi-step interactions across different channels and departments. The platform supports communication across WhatsApp, Instagram, Facebook Messenger, RCS (Rich Communication Services), SMS, and other messaging platforms through a unified API.

Through its 2021 acquisition of Dotgo, Gupshup enhanced its RCS business messaging capabilities. RCS offers features like rich media, interactive buttons, and verified business profiles within native messaging apps.

=== Enterprise Integration and Compliance ===
Gupshup's platform offers integration capabilities with various business systems, including CRM platforms, e-commerce systems, and enterprise applications. These integrations enable businesses to connect their existing systems with Gupshup's conversational interfaces, facilitating seamless data flow and process automation.
