= Active users =

Performance metric for success of an internet product

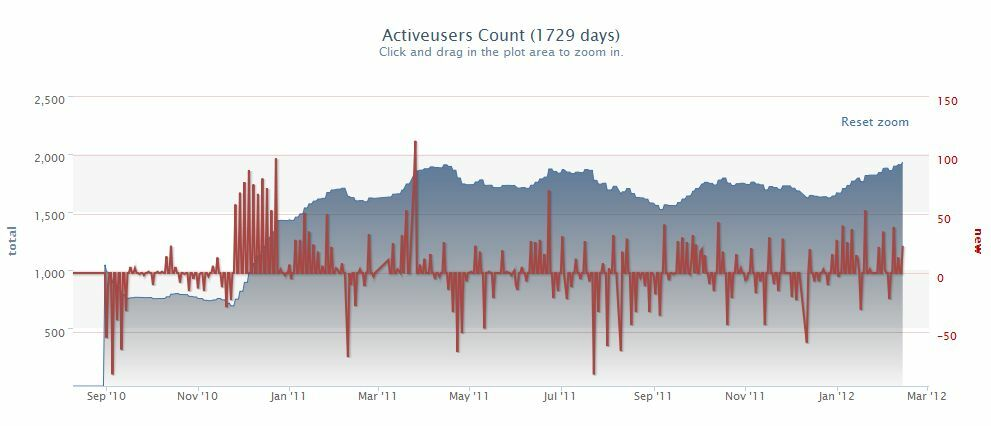
- Number of new and active users in the Indonesian Wikipedia between September 2010 and March 2012

General information
- Unit system: Product metric
- Unit of: Media consumption
- Symbol: DAU, WAU, MAU

Active users is a software performance metric that is commonly used to measure the level of engagement for a particular software product or object, by quantifying the number of active interactions from users or visitors within a relevant range of time (daily, weekly and monthly).

The metric has many uses in software management such as in social networking services, online games, or mobile apps, in web analytics such as in web apps, in commerce such as in online banking and in academia, such as in user behavior analytics and predictive analytics. Although having extensive uses in digital behavioural learning, prediction and reporting, it also has impacts on the privacy and security, and ethical factors should be considered thoroughly. It measures how many users visit or interact with the product or service over a given interval or period. However, there is no standard definition of this term, so comparison of the reporting between different providers of this metric is problematic. Also, most providers have the interest to show this number as high as possible, therefore defining even the most minimal interaction as "active". Still the number is a relevant metric to evaluate development of user interaction of a given provider.

This metric is commonly assessed per month as monthly active users (MAU), per week as weekly active users (WAU), per day as daily active users (DAU) and peak concurrent users (PCU).

== Commercial usage ==
=== Predictors of success engagement measurement (KPI) and advertisement ===
Active users on any time scale offers a rough overview of the amount of returning customers a product maintains, and comparing the changes in this number can be used to predict growth or decline in consumer numbers. In a commercial context, the success of a social-networking-site is generally associated with a growing network of active users (greater volume of site visits), social relationships amongst those users and generated contents. Active Users can be used as a key performance indicator (KPI), managing and predicting future success, in measuring the growth and current volume of users visiting and consuming the site. The ratio of DAU and MAU offers a rudimentary method to estimate customer engagement and retention rate over time. A higher ratio represents a larger retention probability, which often indicates success of a product. Ratios of 0.15 and above are believed to be a tipping point for growth while sustained ratios of 0.2 and above mark lasting success.

Chen, Lu, Chau, and Gupta (2014) argues that greater numbers of users (early adopters) will lead to greater user-generated content, such as posts of photos and videos, that "promotes and propagates" social media acceptance, contributing to social-networking-site growth. The growth of social media use, characterised as increase of active users in a pre-determined timeframe, may increase an individual's social presence. Social presence can be defined as the degree to which a social-networking communications medium allows an individual to feel present with others.

Moon and Kim's (2001) research results found that individual's enjoyment of web systems have positive impacts on their perceptions on the system, and thus would form "high behaviour intention to use it". Munnukka (2007) have found strong correlations between positive previous experience of related types of communications and adoption of new mobile site communication services. However, there are also cases where active users and revenue seemed to have a negative correlation. For instance, Snap Inc.'s gains in daily active users (DAU) have stabilised or decreased during the COVID-19 pandemic, revenue still exceeded estimates, with strong similar strong trends in the current period.

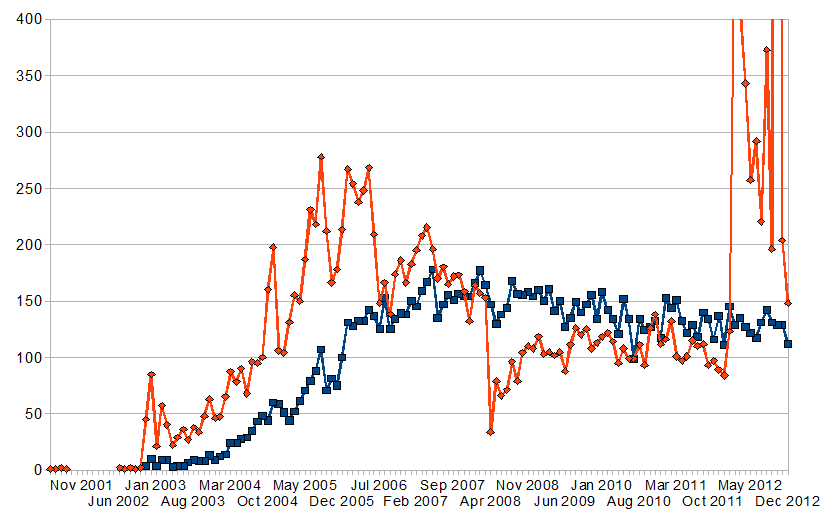
Number of new articles (red line) and active users (blue line) on Swedish Wikipedia

Greater number active users boost the number of visits on particular sites. With more traffic, more advertisers will be attracted, contributing to revenue generation. In 2014, 88% of corporation's purpose of social media usage is advertising. Active Users increase allows social-networking sites to build and follow more customer profiles, that is based on customer's needs and consumption patterns. Active user data can be used to determine high traffic periods and create behavior models of users to be used for targeted advertising. The increase of customer profiles, due to increase of active users, ensures a more relevant personalised and customised advertisements. Bleier and Eisenbeiss (2015) found that more personalised and relevant advertisements increase "view-through responses" and strengthen the effectiveness of "the advertised banner" significantly. DeZoysa (2002) found that consumers are more likely to open and responsive on personalised advertisements that are relevant to them.

=== External reporting purposes ===
The Financial Accounting Standard Board defines that objective of financial reporting is provide relevant and material financial information to financial statement users to allow for decision making and ensure an efficient economic |resource allocation. All reporting entities, primarily publicly listed companies and large private companies are required by law to adhere to disclosure and accounting standards requirements. For example, in Australia, companies are required to comply with accounting standards set by the Australian Accounting Standards Board, which is part of the Corporations Act 2001. In social media company's context, there is also reporting of non-financial information, such as the number of users (active users). Examples may include:

Company	Non-financial metrics
Facebook	Daily Active Users (DAU), Monthly Active Users (MAU)
Twitter	Monthly Active Users (MAU), Timeline Views Per MAU
Groupon	Active Customer Units

Alternative methods of reporting these metrics are through social networks and the web, which have become important part of firm's "information environment" to report financial and non-financial information, according to Frankel (2004), whereby firm relevant information is being spread and disseminated in short spans of time between networks of investors, journalists, and other intermediaries and stakeholders. Investment blogs aggregator, like Seeking Alpha, has become significant for professional financial analysts, who give recommendations on buying and selling stocks. Studies by Frieder and Zittrain (2007) have raised new concerns about how digital communications technologies information reporting have the ability to affect market participants.

Admiraal (2009) emphasised that nonfinancial metrics reported by social media companies, including active users, may give not desirable assurance in success measurements, as the guidance, and reporting regulations that safeguards the reliability and quality of the information are too few and have not yet been standardized. Cohen et al. (2012) research on a set of economic performance indicators found that there is a lack of extensive disclosures and a material variability between disclosure practices based on industries and sizes. In 2008, the U.S. Securities and Exchange Commission took a cautious approach in revising their public disclosure guidance for social media companies and claim the information to be "supplemental rather than sufficient by themselves". Alexander, Raquel, Gendry and James (2014) recommended that executives and managers should take a more strategic approach in managing investor relations and corporate communications, ensuring investor's and analyst's needs are jointly met.

== Usage in academia ==
=== Researching and web-behavioural analysis and prediction ===
The active user metric can be particularly useful in behavioural analytics and predictive analytics. The active user metric in the context of predictive analytics can be applied in a variety of fields including actuarial science, marketing, finance services, healthcare, online-gaming, and social networking. Lewis, Wyatt, and Jeremy (2015), for example, have used this metric conducted a research in the fields of healthcare to study quality and impacts of a mobile application and predicted usage limits of these applications.

Active users can also be used in studies that addresses the issue of mental health problems that could cost the global economy $16 Trillion U.S. Dollars by 2030, if there is a lack of resource allocated for mental health. Through web-behavioural analysis, Chuenphitthayavut, Zihuang, and Zhu (2020) discovered that the promotion of informational, social and emotional support that represents media and public perception has positive effects on their research participants behavioural intention to use online mental health intervention. Online psychological educational program, a type of online mental health interventions are found to promote well-being, and decreased suicidal conception.

In the fields of online-gaming, active users is quite useful in behaviour prediction and churn rates of online games. For example, active user's features such "active Duration" and "play count" can have inverse correlations with churn rates, with "shorter play times and lower play count" associated with higher churn rates. Jia et Al. (2015) showed that there are social structures that transpire or emerge and centred around highly active players, with structural similarity between multiplayer online-games, such as StarCraft II and Dota.

The Active Users metric can be used to predict one's personality traits, which can be classified and grouped into categories. These categories have accuracy that ranges from 84%–92%. Based on the number of user's in a particular group, the internet object associated with it, can be deemed as "trending", and as an "area of interest".

== Ethical considerations and limitations ==
With the internet's evolution into a tool used for communications and socialisation, ethical considerations have also shifted from data-driven to "human-centered", further complicating the ethical issues relating with concepts of public and private on online domains, whereby researchers and subjects do not fully understand the terms and conditions Ethical considerations need to be considered in terms of participative consent, data confidentiality-privacy-integrity, and disciplinary-industry-professional norms and accepted standards in cloud computing and big data research. Boehlefeld (1996) noted that researchers usually refer to ethical principals in their respective disciplines, as they seek guidance and recommended the guidelines by the Association for Computing Machinery to assist researchers of their responsibilities in their research studies in technological or cyberspace.

Informed consent refers to a situation that participant voluntarily participates in the research with full acknowledgement of the methods of research, risks and rewards associated. With the rise internet being used as a social networking tool, active users may face unique challenges in gaining informed consents. Ethical considerations may include degree of knowledge to the participants and age appropriateness, ways and practicality in which researchers inform, and "when" it is appropriate to waive the consent. Crawford and Schultz (2014) have noted consent to be "innumerable" and "yet-to-be-determined" before the research is conducted. Grady et al. (2017) pointed out that technological advancements can assist in obtaining consent without the in-person meeting of investigators (researchers) and the research participants.

A large number of researches is based on individualised data, that encompass users online identity (their clicks, readings, movements) and contents consumed and with data-analytics produced inferences about their preferences, social relationships, and movement or work habits. In some cases, individuals may greatly benefit, but in others they can be harmed. Afolabi and García-Basteiro (2017) believed that informed consent to research studies is beyond "clicking blocks or supplying signature", as participants could have feel pressured in to joining the research, without researcher's awareness of the situation. There is yet to be a universally accepted form of industry standards and norms in terms of data-privacy, confidentiality and integrity, a critical ethics consideration, but there has been attempts to design a process to oversee the research activities and data collection to better meet the community and end-user's expectations. There are also policy debates around ethical issues regarding the integration of edtech (education technology) into K-12 education environment, as minor children are perceived to be most vulnerable segment of the entire population.

== Technical limitations and challenges ==
Many social media companies have their respective differences definition and calculation methods of the active users metric. These differences often cause differences in the variable that the metric is measuring. Wyatt (2008) argues that there is evidence that some metrics reported by social media companies do not appear to be reliable, as it requires categorical judgements, but is still value-relevant to financial statement users. Luft (2009) conveyed that non-financial metric, like active users, there presents challenges in measurement accuracy and appropriateness in weighting when coupled with accounting reporting measures. There has been increasing notice from business presses and academia on corporate conventions of disclosure of these information.

Active users are calculated using the internal data of the specific company. Data is collected based on unique users performing specific actions which data collectors deem as a sign of activity. These actions include visiting the home or splash page of a website, logging in, commentating, uploading content, or similar actions which make use of the product. The number of people subscribed to a service may also be considered an active user for its duration. Each company has their own method of determining their number of active users, and many companies do not share specific details regarding how they calculate them. Some companies make changes to their calculation method over time. The specific action flagging users as active greatly impacts the quality of the data if it does not accurately reflect engagement with the product, resulting in misleading data. Basic actions such as logging into the product may not be an accurate representation of customer engagement and inflate the number of active users, while uploading content or commenting may be too specific for a product and under-represent user activity.

Weitz, Henry and Rosenthal (2014) suggested that factors that may affect accuracy of metrics like active users include issues relating to definition and calculation, circumstances of deceptive inflation, uncertainty specification and user-shared, duplicate or fake accounts. The authors describes Facebook monthly active users criterion as registered users past 30 days, have used the messenger, and took action to share content and activity differing from LinkedIn who uses registered members, page visits and views. For example, a customer who uses the Facebook once, to "comment" or "share content", may also be counted as an "active user". A potential cause for these inaccuracies in measurement is the implemented Pay-for-Performance systems, that encourages desired behaviours, included high-performance work system. In social media companies, active users is one of the crucial metric that measures the success of the product. Trueman, Wong, and Zhang (2000) have found that in most cases unique visitors and pageviews as a measurement of web-usage accounts for changes in stock prices, and net income in internet companies. Lazer, Lev and Livnat (2001) found that more popular website generated greater stock returns, in their research analysis of traffic data of internet companies through the division of higher and lower than median traffic data. Yielding portfolio more returns may sway investors to vote on a more favourable bonus package for executive management. Kang, Lee and Na's (2010) research on the 2008 financial crisis highlights the importance of prevention of "expropriation incentives" of investors, that provides very prominent implications on corporate governance, especially during an economic shock.

Active user is limited in examining pre-adoption and post-adoption behaviours of users. Users commitment to a particular online product may also depend on trust and the alternatives quality. Pre-adoption behaviour's effects on post-adoption behaviour, that is predicted by past research has suggested, is found to have associations with factors such as habit, gender and some other socio-cultural demographics. Buchanan and Gillies (1990) and Reichheld and Schefter (2000) argues that post-adoption behaviours and continuous usage is "relatively more important than first-time or initial usage" as it shows "the degree of consumer loyalty", and that ultimately produces long term product value.
