= Registered user =

Signed-in or logged-in user

A registered user is a user of a website, program, or other systems who has previously registered. Registered users normally provide some sort of credentials (such as a username or e-mail address, and a password) to the system in order to prove their identity: this is known as logging in. Systems intended for use by the general public often allow any user to register simply by selecting a register or sign up function and providing these credentials for the first time. Registered users may be granted privileges beyond those granted to unregistered users.

== Rationale ==
User registration and login enables a system to personalize itself. For example, a website might display a welcome banner with the user's name and change its appearance or behavior according to preferences indicated by the user. The system may also allow a logged-in user to send and receive messages, and to view and modify personal files or other information.

== Criticism ==
=== Privacy concerns ===
Registration necessarily provides more personal information to a system than it would otherwise have. Even if the credentials used are otherwise meaningless, the system can distinguish a logged-in user from other users and might use this property to store a history of users' actions or activity, possibly without their knowledge or consent. While many systems have privacy policies, depending on the nature of the system, a user might not have any way of knowing for certain exactly what information is stored, how it is used, and with whom, if anyone, it is shared. A system could even sell information it has gathered on its users to third parties for advertising or other purposes. The subject of systems' transparency in this regard is one of ongoing debate.

=== User inconvenience ===
Registration may be seen as an annoyance or hindrance, especially if it is not inherently necessary or important (for example, in the context of a search engine) or if the system repeatedly prompts users to register. A system's registration process might also be time-consuming or require the user to provide information they might be reluctant to, such as a home address or social security number.

== See also ==
- Access control
- Active users
- Background checks
- Do Not Track
- Electronic identification
- Solid (web decentralization project)
- Unique user
- Closed platform
