= Media Revenue Generation =

Revenue generation is complete amount of money that is generated during a specific time period. The money is used to calculate business profits. Media houses make their money through direct payment and indirect payment. Direct payment is the money a consumer pays the media house in exchange for a good or service. This would be the payment from the consumer for a newspaper, paying to call into a radio station or paying to receive cable. Subscriptions are also another form of direct payment. In this instance the customer would pay the company, normally a magazine or a comic book a set fee of money under a contracted time and receive weekly or monthly issues. Indirect payment is money companies earn outside of what the consumer pays for. Companies use their platforms to place advertisements and direct payment by politicians for advertise amongst their content for consumers.
