= Unique user =

Metric of website visitation

A unique user is a term in web analytics that refers to data of a Pageview of a unique IP, whose presence is only counted once, regardless of the number of pages they visit. This definition does not count repeat or returning users for a standard period of time (Active users), who are traced by placing a cookie on the user's device. A website's number of unique users is measured over a standard period of time. The metric is often quoted to potential advertisers or investors.

== Tracking unique users ==
The purpose of tracking unique users is to help marketers understand a website's user behavior. This metric can be used to demonstrate the reach of digital content, set benchmarks for website performance, and perform competitive analysis. It can also be used to demonstrate website popularity and performance to potential advertisers and investors. Marketers and webmasters can track unique users in digital analytics tools, for example, Google Analytics.

Measuring unique user data can be distorted by automatic activity, for example, bots or other instances of the website being opened where there is no human present or interacting with the website. Estimations of unique user traffic statistics are usually filtered to remove this type of activity by eliminating known IP addresses for bots, by requiring registration or cookies, or by using panel data.

== See also ==
- Active users
- Pageview
- Registered user
- Web traffic
- Web analytics
