= Facebook Messenger =

Instant messaging app by Meta Platforms

Messenger
- Logo used since 2025

- Rendering of the Messenger app on iOS platforms
- Developer: Meta Platforms
- Release: August 9, 2011; 15 years ago April 2020; 6 years ago

Stable release(s) [±]

Preview release(s) [±]
- Operating system: Web, Android, iOS, Wear OS Discontinued: macOS, Windows (2025); watchOS (2023); Windows Phone, Windows 10 Mobile (2019); BlackBerry OS, BlackBerry 10 (2016)
- Size: 53.33 MB (Android); 124.1 MB (iOS)
- Available in: 111 languages
- List of languages Afrikaans, Albanian, Amharic, Arabic, Armenian, Assamese, Azerbaijani, Basque, Belarusian, Bengali, Bosnian, Breton, Bulgarian, Burmese, Catalan, Cebuano, Corsican, Croatian, Czech, Danish, Dutch, Dutch (België), English (UK), English (US), English (upside down), Esperanto, Estonian, Faroese, Filipino, Finnish, French (Canada), French (France), Frisian, Fula, Galician, Georgian, German, Greek, Guarani, Gujarati, Haitian Creole, Hausa, Hebrew, Hindi, Hungarian, Icelandic, Indonesian, Irish, Italian, Japanese, Japanese (Kansai), Javanese, Kannada, Kazakh, Khmer, Kinyarwanda, Korean, Kurdish (Kurmanji), Kyrgyz, Lao, Latvian, Lithuanian, Macedonian, Malagasy, Malay, Malayalam, Maltese, Marathi, Mongolian, Nepali, Norwegian (bokmal), Norwegian (nynorsk), Oriya, Pashto, Persian, Polish, Portuguese (Brazil), Portuguese (Portugal), Punjabi, Romanian, Russian, Sardinian, Serbian, Shona, Silesian, Simplified Chinese (China), Sinhala, Slovak, Slovenian, Somali, Sorani Kurdish, Spanish, Spanish (Spain), Swahili, Swedish, Syriac, Tajik, Tamazight, Tamil, Tatar, Telugu, Thai, Traditional Chinese (Hong Kong), Traditional Chinese (Taiwan), Turkish, Ukrainian, Urdu, Uzbek, Vietnamese, Welsh and Zaza
- Type: Instant messaging, VoIP
- License: Freeware, proprietary
- Website: messenger.com/ facebook.com/messenger/

Messenger is an American proprietary instant messaging service developed by Meta Platforms, the company that operates Facebook. Originally developed as Facebook Chat in 2008, the client application of Messenger is currently available on iOS and Android mobile platforms, through the Messenger.com web application, and on the standalone Meta Portal hardware.

Messenger is used to send messages and exchange photos, videos, stickers, audio, and files, and also react to other users' messages and interact with bots. The service also supports voice and video calling. The standalone apps support using multiple accounts, conversations with end-to-end encryption, and playing games. There are also group chats where you can connect with multiple people at once in a private space such as Panama Chat.

With a monthly userbase of over 1 billion people, it is among the largest social media platforms.

== History ==
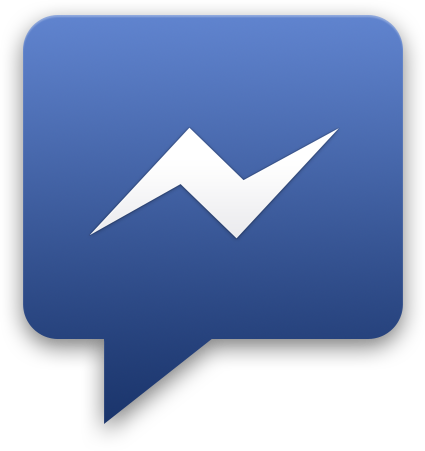
Messenger Icon from August 9, 2011, to 2013

Messenger Icon from 2013 to 2018

Messenger Icon from 2018 to April 2020

Messenger Icon from April 2020 to February 22, 2025

Messenger Icon since February 23, 2025

Following tests of a new instant messaging platform on Facebook in March 2008, the feature, then-titled "Facebook Chat", was gradually released to users in April 2008. Facebook revamped its messaging platform in November 2010, and subsequently acquired group messaging service Beluga in March 2011, which the company used to launch its standalone iOS and Android mobile apps on August 9, 2011. Facebook later launched a BlackBerry version in October 2011. An app for Windows Phone, though lacking features including voice messaging and chat heads, was released in March 2014. In April 2014, Facebook announced that the messaging feature would be removed from the main Facebook app and users will be required to download the separate Messenger app. An iPad-optimized version of the iOS app was released in July 2014. On April 8, 2015, Facebook launched a website interface for Messenger. A Tizen app was released on July 13, 2015. Facebook launched Messenger for Windows 10 in April 2016. In October 2016, Facebook released Messenger Lite, a stripped-down version of Messenger with a reduced feature set. The app is aimed primarily at old Android phones and regions where high-speed Internet is not widely available. In April 2017, Messenger Lite was expanded to 132 more countries. In May 2017, Facebook revamped the design for Messenger on Android and iOS, bringing a new home screen with tabs and categorization of content and interactive media, red dots indicating new activity, and relocated sections.

Facebook announced a Messenger program for Windows 7 in a limited beta test in November 2011. The following month, Israeli blog TechIT leaked a download link for the program, with Facebook subsequently confirming and officially releasing the program. The program was eventually discontinued in March 2014. A Firefox web browser add-on was released in December 2012, but was also discontinued in March 2014.

In December 2017, Facebook announced Messenger Kids, a new app aimed for persons under 13 years of age. The app comes with some differences compared to the standard version. In 2019, Messenger announced to be the 2nd most downloaded mobile app of the decade, from 2011 to 2019. In December 2019, Messenger dropped support for users to sign in using only a mobile number, meaning that users must sign in to a Facebook account in order to use the service.

In March 2020, Facebook started to ship its dedicated Messenger for macOS app through the Mac App Store. The app is currently live in regions including France, Australia, Mexico, Poland, and many others.

In April 2020, Facebook began rolling out a new feature called Messenger Rooms, a video chat feature that allows users to chat with up to 50 people at a time. The feature rivals Zoom, an application that gained a lot of popularity during the COVID-19 pandemic. Privacy concerns arose since the feature uses the same data collection policies as mainstream Facebook.

In July 2020, Facebook added a new feature in Messenger that lets iOS users to use Apple's Face ID or Touch ID to lock their chats. The feature is called App Lock and is a part of several changes in Messenger regarding privacy and security. The option to view only "Unread Threads" was removed from the inbox, requiring the account holder to scroll through the entire inbox to be certain every unread message has been seen.

On October 13, 2020, the Messenger application introduced cross-app messaging with Instagram, which was launched in September 2021. In addition to the integrated messaging, the application announced the introduction of a new logo, which should be an amalgamation of the Messenger and Instagram logo.

The desktop app of Messenger was shut down on December 15, 2025. Messaging services were moved to the Facebook website or Messenger's site for those without an account on the former.

The Messenger site was discontinued on April 16, 2026. Messaging services were moved to the Facebook website on the morning of April 17, 2026; users without a Messenger account were required to use a Facebook account. However, later in 2026, the Messenger.com site continued to be functional.

== Features ==
The following is a table of features available in Messenger, as well as their geographical coverage and what devices they are available on. In addition there is a vanishing message feature. In addition there is an audio recording feature which allows audio recordings of up to one minute which may or may not be vanishing:

Feature	Added	Description	Platforms	Availability
Messaging XMPP users	February 2010 (discontinued)	At the time Messenger was called Facebook Chat, in February 2010 Facebook introduced a way to message users across the entire XMPP network. This function was sunset on 30 April 2015.		
Sign up without a Facebook account	December 2012 (discontinued)	Android users can sign up to the app without a Facebook account, requiring only a name and phone number.	Mobile	Global
Sign up without a Facebook account	2024	Users in the European Economic Area can sign up to the app without a Facebook account, requiring only a Messenger account.	All	European Economic Area
Direct messaging	October 2013	Users can send messages to other users without the requirement of being friends, as long as the user has the phone number of the other user in their contact list.	All	Global
Chat Heads	April 2013	Android users can use round icons with a contact's profile photo, appearing on the screen regardless of which app is open.	Mobile	Global
Money transfer (Messenger Pay)	March 2015	A feature for U.S. users to send money to friends. In April 2017, the feature was expanded to support group payments.	Mobile	U.S.
Calls	January 2013	In January 2013, Facebook added voice calling to Messenger users in Canada, expanding the feature to users in the United States a few days later. In April 2015, Facebook introduced video calling in select countries. In April 2016, group voice calling was introduced, with a maximum number of 50 call participants. The following December, Facebook enabled group video calling for up to 50 people. In June 2017, Facebook updated video chats to give users the ability to add animated versions of Facebook's reactions on top of their face, such as tears for a crying face and an exploding halo of hearts around the head when sending heart emoji. Additionally, users are able to capture screenshots, and live filters can change the color or lighting in the feed.	All	Global
Location sharing	June 2015	Users can tap on a "Location" button and are then shown a map with the ability to pinpoint any location, even if the user themselves is not present at the place. In March 2017, it introduced live location sharing, letting users temporarily share their location with a friend or group of friends for one hour at a time.	Mobile	Global
Business interaction		At the Facebook F8 conference on March 25, 2015, Facebook announced that Messenger would start letting users interact with businesses, including track purchases and receive notifications, and have personal conversations with company customer service representatives.		
Third-party app integration		Users are able to open compatible third-party apps inside Messenger, such as a movie ticketing service or GIF generators, and then share those details with the other chat participants.	Mobile	Global
Transportation requests	December 2015	Messenger integrated with Uber to let U.S. users request a car directly from the app. Support for Lyft was added in March 2016. Support for UberPOOL was introduced in July 2016.	Mobile	U.S.
SMS support	2012	Facebook implemented support for SMS texting within the Messenger Android app. However, the feature was dropped in 2013 due to "extensive reworking" of the app, with a Facebook product manager stating that the SMS feature "just didn't take off". SMS was once again introduced in testing in February 2016, before the official global rollout started in June. SMS support in Messenger was again removed in September 2023.	Android	Global
Multiple accounts	February 2016	Facebook added support for multiple accounts in the apps.	Mobile	Global
Bot platform	April 2016	2016 launch In April 2016, Facebook announced a bot platform for Messenger, including an API to build chat bots to interact with users. News publisher bots "message subscribers directly with news and other information", while ride-sharing apps can offer a transportation option, hotel chains can answer questions about accommodations, and air travel companies can allow for check-ins, flight updates and travel changes. 2017 enhancements At the 2017 Facebook F8 conference, Facebook announced a range of enhancements for bots: Bots in group chats: Bots can participate in group chats – not by conversing with the chat participants — but by injecting notifications such as news updates, receipts, sports progress, and more.; Chat extensions: Users can interact with dedicated apps, including play games, collaborate on music playlists, and book flights. In addition, Facebook announced a "Discovery" tab, featuring recently used bots, bot categories, trending experiences and search functionality. A preview screen lets users see what each chat would do in a conversation.; QR scan: Users can scan special, branded QR codes through Messenger's camera functionality, that take the user directly to a specific bot.; The slightly renamed "Discover" tab was officially launched in the United States in late June 2017.	All	Global
"M" assistant	April 2017 (terminated)	In August 2015, Facebook announced M, an artificial intelligence virtual assistant for use in Messenger that is capable of automatically completing tasks for users, such as purchase items, arrange gift deliveries, book restaurants, and arrange travels. In April 2017, Facebook enabled M for users in the U.S. M scans chats for keywords and then suggests relevant actions. For example, writing "You owe me $20" will make M offer its payments system. The rollout of M suggestions was made official at Facebook's F8 conference on April 18, 2017. In January 2018 it was announced that M would be discontinued at some future date.	All	U.S.
"Home" messages panel	June 2016	Facebook announced a "Home" button as a central location for sending and receiving messages. The Home button features the most recent messages, as well as a "Favorites" section for the contacts with the most frequent communication.	Mobile	Global
Secret Conversations	October 2016	Messenger users can send each other end-to-end encrypted messages through an optional mode called "Secret Conversations", which uses the Signal Protocol. Users can also choose to send each other "self-destructing" messages; messages that are removed permanently following an optional time period. This feature is only available in mobile apps, not in the web version. Originally planned in 2022, end-to-end encryption by default is delayed to 2023.	Mobile	Global
Instant Games	November 2016	Allows users to quickly play games including Pac-Man, Space Invaders, EverWing and Words with Friends Frenzy inside Messenger. Games are asynchronous through high scores rather than directly at the same time, and are built on HTML5 rather than apps. In May 2017, Facebook announced the global rollout of Instant Games.	Mobile	Global
Messenger Day	March 2017	Following an initial test in Poland in September 2016, Facebook launched "Messenger Day" in March 2017. Messenger Day, similar to Snapchat's Stories feature, gives the user the ability to share photos and videos with friends that automatically disappear after 24 hours.	Mobile	Global
Reactions and Mentions	March 2017	Reactions let the user tap and hold on a message to add a reaction through an emoji, while Mentions let the user type @ in a group chat to give a particular user a direct notification.	All	Global
Augmented reality effects	December 2017	"World Effects" lets users add 3D augmented reality effects into their photos and videos.	Mobile	Global
AI Chatbots in messengers	January 2018	Facebook started allowing messenger AI bots after 2 steps of verification.	All	Global
Replies	March 2019	Facebook added the ability to quote and reply to specific messages in a conversation.	All	Global
Messenger Rooms	April 2020	A video chat feature that allows users to chat with up to 50 people at a time.	All	Global

=== Messenger Rooms ===
It is a video conferencing feature of Messenger. It allows users to add up to 50 people at a time. Messenger Rooms does not require a Facebook account. Messenger Rooms competes with other services such as Zoom.

Back in 2014, Facebook introduced an unrelated, stand-alone application named Rooms, letting users create places for users with similar interests, with users being anonymous to others. This was shut down in December 2015.

In April 2020, during the COVID-19 pandemic, Facebook revealed video conferencing features for Messenger called Messenger Rooms. This was seen as a response to the popularity of other video conferencing platforms such as Zoom and Skype in the midst of the COVID-19 pandemic.

Messenger Rooms allows users to add up to 50 people per room, without restrictions on time. It does not require a Facebook account or a separate app from Messenger. When used, it only prompts the user for basic information. Users can add 360° virtual backgrounds, mood lighting, and other AR effects as well as share screens. To prevent unwanted participants from joining, users can lock rooms and remove participants.

Some have voiced concerns in regards to Messenger Room's privacy and how its parent, Facebook, handles data. Messenger Rooms, unlike some of its competitors, does not use end-to-end encryption. In addition, there have been concerns over how Messenger Rooms collects user data.

== Monetization ==
In January 2017, Facebook announced that it was testing showing advertisements in Messenger's home feed. At the time, the testing was limited to a "small number of users in Australia and Thailand", with the ad format being swipe-based carousel ads. In July, the company announced that they were expanding the testing to a global audience. Stan Chudnovsky, head of Messenger, told VentureBeat that "We'll start slow ... When the average user can be sure to see them we truly don't know because we're just going to be very data-driven and user feedback-driven on making that decision". Facebook told TechCrunch that the advertisements' placement in the inbox depends on factors such as thread count, phone screen size, and pixel density. In a TechCrunch editorial by Devin Coldewey, he described the ads as "huge" in the space they occupy, "intolerable" in the way they appear in the user interface, and "irrelevant" due to the lack of context. Coldewey finished by writing "Advertising is how things get paid for on the internet, including TechCrunch, so I'm not an advocate of eliminating it or blocking it altogether. But bad advertising experiences can spoil a perfectly good app like (for the purposes of argument) Messenger. Messaging is a personal, purposeful use case and these ads are a bad way to monetize it."

== Reception ==
In November 2014, the Electronic Frontier Foundation (EFF) listed Messenger (Facebook chat) on its Secure Messaging Scorecard. It received a score of 2 out of 7 points on the scorecard. It received points for having communications encrypted in transit and for having recently completed an independent security audit. It missed points because the communications were not encrypted with keys the provider didn't have access to, users could not verify contacts' identities, past messages were not secure if the encryption keys were stolen, the source code was not open to independent review, and the security design was not properly documented.

As stated by Facebook in its Help Center, there is no way to log out of the Messenger application. Instead, users can choose between different availability statuses, including "Appear as inactive", "Switch accounts", and "Turn off notifications". Media outlets have reported on a workaround, by pressing a "Clear data" option in the application's menu in Settings on Android devices, which returns the user to the log-in screen.

== User growth ==
After being separated from the main Facebook app, Messenger had 600 million users in April 2015. This grew to 900 million in June 2016, 1 billion in July 2016, and 1.2 billion in April 2017.

In March 2020, total messaging traffic increased by 50% in countries that were on quarantine due to the COVID-19 outbreak. Group calls grew by more than 1,000%.

== Government attempt at surveillance/decryption ==
In early 2018, the US Department of Justice went to court to attempt to force Facebook to modify its Messenger app to enable surveillance by third parties so that agents could listen in on encrypted voice conversations over Messenger. The court decided against the Justice Department, but sealed the case. In November 2018, the ACLU and EFF filed suit to have the case unsealed so that the public can be informed about the encryption/surveillance debate. This motion was denied in February 2019, and an appeal was filed in April 2020. The appeals court confirmed the original denial on July 22, 2020.

== See also ==
- Messenger Kids
- Comparison of cross-platform instant messaging clients
- Comparison of VoIP software
