= Standard algorithms =

Computation method

In elementary arithmetic, a standard algorithm or method is a specific method of computation which is conventionally taught for solving particular mathematical problems. These methods vary somewhat by nation and time, but generally include exchanging, regrouping, long division, and long multiplication using a standard notation, and standard formulas for average, area, and volume. Similar methods also exist for procedures such as square root and even more sophisticated functions, but have fallen out of the general mathematics curriculum in favor of calculators (or tables and slide rules before them). As to standard algorithms in elementary mathematics, Fischer et al. (2019) state that advanced students use standard algorithms more effectively than peers who use these algorithms unreasoningly (Fischer et al. 2019). That said, standard algorithms, such as addition, subtraction, as well as those mentioned above, represent central components of elementary math.

== Traditional standard algorithms ==
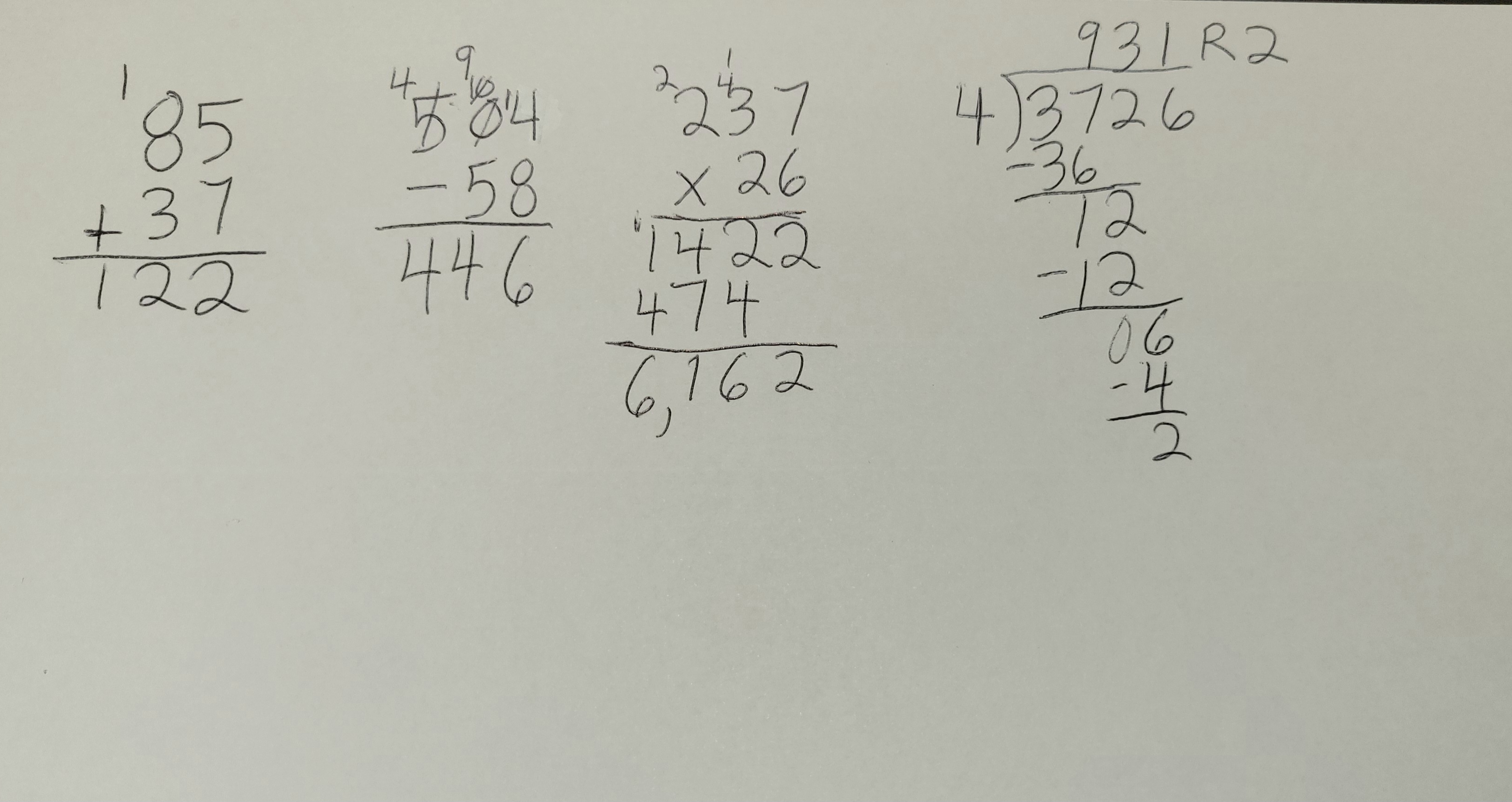
Illustration of Traditional Standard Algorithms - Addition, Subtraction, Multiplication, Division

Standard algorithms are digit oriented, largely right-handed (begin operations with digits in the ones place), and focus on rules (Charles, 2020). Below, the standard arithmetic algorithms for addition, subtraction, multiplication, and division are described.

=== Standard addition algorithm ===
For example, through the standard addition algorithm, the sum can be obtained by following three rules: a) line up the digits of each addend by place value, longer digit addends should go on top, b) each addend can be decomposed -- ones are added with ones, tens are added with tens, and so on, and c) if the sum of the digits of the current place value is ten or greater, then the number must be regrouped.

=== Standard subtraction algorithm ===
For the standard subtraction algorithm, the first number is called the minuend and the second number is called the subtrahend. Regarding the rules of this algorithm, the place values of the numbers must align. Then, it must be evaluated whether regrouping or ungrouping is necessary. Then,

either treat each place value column separately and ungroup and subtract before moving on, or check all potential ungroupings first and then perform all the subtractions. (Achieve The Core, nd)

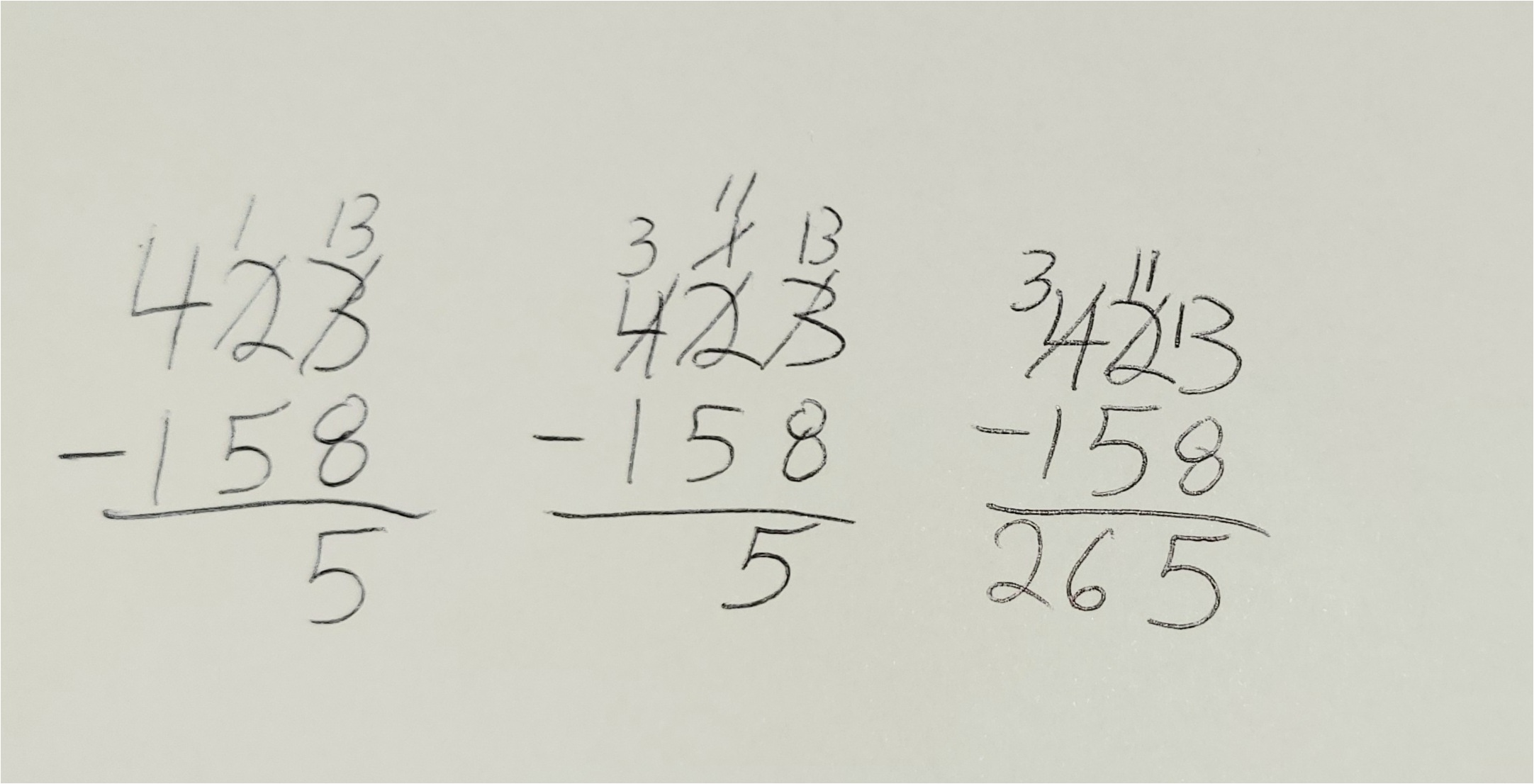
Standard subtraction algorithm. Regrouping and ungrouping.

=== Standard multiplication algorithm ===
The main rules for the standard multiplication algorithm of whole numbers follow. In this multiplication procedure, "multiply the multiplicand by each digit of the multiplier and then add up all the appropriately shifted results". (West, 2011) To utilize this method, it is necessary to know the basic multiplication table from zero to nine. (West 2011)

=== Standard division algorithm ===
Unlike the other standard algorithms, the division algorithm begins with the larger (left-hand) place values (Lee 2007). The quotient (rounded down to the nearest integer) becomes the first digit of the result. In this process, a maximum digit approaches the virtual product (Leung, 2006), which must be less than the dividend's leading place values. In turn, the difference between the leading place values and the virtual product, or remainder, pushes forward when the process is repeated on the following digit of the dividend ('pulling down' the next digit to the remainder) (Leung, 2006). When all digits have been processed and no remainder is left or the remainder is less than the divisor, the division is complete.

== Reform mathematics and standard algorithms in schools ==
The concepts of reform mathematics which the NCTM introduced in 1989 favors an alternative approach. It proposes a deeper understanding of the underlying theory instead of memorization of specific methods will allow students to develop individual methods which solve the same problems. Students' alternative algorithms are often just as correct, efficient, and generalizable as the standard algorithms, and maintain emphasis on the meaning of the quantities involved, especially as relates to place values (something that is usually lost in the memorization of standard algorithms). The development of sophisticated calculators has made manual calculation less important (see the note on square roots, above) and cursory teaching of traditional methods has created failure among many students. Greater achievement among all types of students is among the primary goals of mathematics education put forth by NCTM. Some researchers such as Constance Kamii have suggested that elementary arithmetic, as traditionally taught, is not appropriate in elementary school. Many first editions of textbooks written to the original 1989 standard such as TERC deliberately discouraged teaching of any particular method, instead devoting class and homework time to the solving of nontrivial problems, which stimulate students to develop their own methods of calculation, rooted in number sense and place value. This emphasis by no means excludes the learning of number facts; indeed, a major goal of early mathematical education is procedural fluency.

The NCTM in recent revisions has made more explicit this need for learning of basic math facts and correct, efficient methods. Many new editions of standards-based texts do present standard methods and basic skills. However, the original guidelines continue to draw fire from well-meaning parents and community members, some of whom advocate a return to traditional mathematics. Success of a particular text depends not only upon its content, but also on the willingness of a school community to allow new pedagogy and content and to commit to the recommended implementation of the materials.
