= Interactive Mathematics Program =

Key Curriculum Press Interactive Math program

The Interactive Mathematics Program (IMP) is a four-year, problem-based mathematics curriculum for high schools. It was one of several curricula funded by the National Science Foundation and designed around the 1989 National Council of Teachers of Mathematics (NCTM) standards. The IMP books were authored by Dan Fendel and Diane Resek, professors of mathematics at San Francisco State University, and by Lynne Alper and Sherry Fraser. IMP was published by Key Curriculum Press in 1997 and sold in 2012 to It's About Time.

== Curriculum ==
Designed in response to national reports pointing to the need for a major overhaul in mathematics education, the IMP curriculum is markedly different in structure, content, and pedagogy from courses more typically found in the high school sequence.

- Each book of the curriculum is divided into five- to eight-week units, each having a central problem or theme. This larger problem is intended to serve as motivation for students to develop the underlying skills and concepts needed to solve it, through solving a variety of smaller related problems.
- There is an emphasis on asking students to work together in collaborative groups.
- It is hoped that communication skills will be developed; exercises aimed at this goal are embedded throughout the curriculum, through the use of group and whole class discussions, the use of writing to present and clarify mathematical solutions; in some IEP classes, formal oral presentations are required.
- The IMP curriculum expects students to make nearly daily use of a scientific graphing calculator.

== Controversy ==
Nearly every one of these distinctive characteristics has generated controversy and placed the IMP curriculum right in the middle of the “math wars,” the conflict between those that favor more traditional curricula in mathematics education and the supporters of the reform curricula that were largely an outgrowth of the 1989 NCTM standards.

IMP is among the reform curricula that have been heavily criticized by organizations such as Mathematically Correct. That organization's Internet site begins with a statement that “advocates of the new, fuzzy math” (focus) “on things like calculators, blocks, guesswork, and group activities and they shun things like algorithms and repeated practice. The new programs are shy on fundamentals and they also lack the mathematical depth and rigor that promotes greater achievement.” Former NCTM president Frank Allen states, “Trying to organize school mathematics around problem solving instead of using its own internal structure for that purpose … (is destroying) essential connections….”

Criticism often includes anecdotal evidence including stories of school districts that have decided to discontinue or supplement use of the IMP curriculum and of students who did not feel they had been prepared adequately for college.

Supporters point to statistical studies that compare the performance of students enrolled in IMP courses with their peers enrolled in traditional high school mathematics courses. Merlino and Wolff, two such researchers, report that in their several studies IMP students consistently outperformed traditionally taught students on both the math and verbal sections of the PSAT, as well as on the SAT-9. Kramer reported that grade 12 IMP students in his study performed better on all areas of mathematics tested by the NAEP test, and Webb and Dowling reported IMP students performed significantly better on statistics questions from the Second International Mathematics Study, on mathematical reasoning and problem solving tasks designed by the State of Wisconsin, and on a quantitative reasoning test developed by a university to administer to entering students.

== See also ==
- Core-Plus Mathematics Project
