= Core-Plus Mathematics Project =

High school mathematics program

Core-Plus Mathematics, CCSS Edition

Core-Plus Mathematics is a high school mathematics program consisting of a four-year series of print and digital student textbooks and supporting materials for teachers, developed by the Core-Plus Mathematics Project (CPMP) at Western Michigan University, with funding from the National Science Foundation. Development of the program started in 1992. The first edition, entitled Contemporary Mathematics in Context: A Unified Approach, was completed in 1995. The third edition, entitled Core-Plus Mathematics: Contemporary Mathematics in Context, was published by McGraw-Hill Education in 2015. All rights were returned to the authors in 2024, who have made all textbooks freely available.

== Key Features ==
The first edition of Core-Plus Mathematics was designed to meet the curriculum, teaching, and assessment standards from the National Council of Teachers of Mathematics and the broad goals outlined in the National Research Council report, Everybody Counts: A Report to the Nation on the Future of Mathematics Education. Later editions were designed to also meet the American Statistical Association Guidelines for Assessment and Instruction in Statistics Education (GAISE) and most recently the standards for mathematical content and practice in the Common Core State Standards for Mathematics (CCSSM).

The program puts an emphasis on teaching and learning mathematics through mathematical modeling and mathematical inquiry. Each year, students learn mathematics in four interconnected strands: algebra and functions, geometry and trigonometry, statistics and probability, and discrete mathematical modeling.

=== First Edition (1994-2003) ===
The program originally comprised three courses, intended to be taught in grades 9 through 11. Later, authors added a fourth course intended for college-bound students.

Unit No.	Course 1	Course 2	Course 3
1	Patterns in Data	Matrix Models	Multiple-Variable Models
2	Patterns of Change	Patterns of Location, Shape and Size	Modeling Public Opinion
3	Linear Models	Patterns of Association	Symbol Sense and Algebraic Reasoning
4	Graph Models	Power Models	Shapes and Geometric Reasoning
5	Patterns in Space and Visualization	Network Optimization	Patterns in Variation
6	Exponential Models	Geometric Form and Its Function	Families of Functions
7	Simulation Models	Patterns in Chance	Discrete Models of Change
Capstone	Planning a Benefits Carnival	Forest, the Environment, and Mathematics	Making the Best of It: Optimal Forms and Strategies

Course 4 Units
Core Units	Additional Units for Students Intending to Pursue Programs in:	
Core Units	Mathematical, Physical and Biological Sciences or Engineering	Social, Management, and Health Sciences or Humanities
1. Rates of Change	6. Polynomial and Rational Functions	5. Binomial Distributions and Statistical Inference
2. Modeling Motion	7. Functions and Symbolic Reasoning	9. Informatics
3. Logarithmic Functions and Data Models	8. Space Geometry	10. Problem Solving, Algorithms, and Spreadsheets
4. Counting Models		

=== Second Edition (2008-2011) ===
The course was re-organized around interwoven strands of algebra and functions, geometry and trigonometry, statistics and probability, and discrete mathematics. Lesson structure was updated, and technology tools, including CPMP-Tools software was introduced.

Unit No.	Course 1	Course 2	Course 3	Course 4: Preparation for Calculus
1	Patterns of Change	Functions, Equations, and Systems	Reasoning and Proof	Families of Functions
2	Patterns in Data	Matrix Methods	Inequalities and Linear Programming	Vectors and Motion
3	Linear Functions	Coordinate Methods	Similarity and Congruence	Algebraic Functions and Equations
4	Vertex-Edge Graphs	Regression and Correlation	Samples and Variation	Trigonometric Functions and Equations
5	Exponential Functions	Nonlinear Functions and Equations	Polynomial and Rational Functions	Exponential Functions, Logarithms, and Data Modeling
6	Patterns in Shape	Network Optimization	Circles and Circular Functions	Surfaces and Cross Sections
7	Quadratic Functions	Trigonometric Methods	Recursion and Iteration	Concepts of Calculus
8	Patterns in Chance	Probability Distributions	Inverse Functions	Counting Methods and Induction

=== CCSS Edition (2015) ===
The course was aligned with the Common Core State Standards (CCSS) mathematical practices and content expectations. Expanded and enhanced Teacher's Guides include a CCSS pathway and a CPMP pathway through each unit. Course 4 was split into two versions: one called Preparation for Calculus, for STEM-oriented students, and an alternative course, Transition to College Mathematics and Statistics (TCMS), for college-bound students whose intended program of study does not require calculus.

Unit No.	Course 1	Course 2	Course 3	Course 4: Preparation for Calculus	TCMS
1	Patterns of Change	Functions, Equations, and Systems	Reasoning and Proof	Families of Functions	Interpreting Categorical Data
2	Patterns in Data	Matrix Methods	Inequalities and Linear Programming	Vectors and Motion	Functions Modeling Change
3	Linear Functions	Coordinate Methods	Similarity and Congruence	Algebraic Functions and Equations	Counting Methods
4	Discrete Mathematical Modeling	Regression and Correlation	Samples and Variation	Trigonometric Functions and Equations	Mathematics of Financial Decision-Making
5	Exponential Functions	Nonlinear Functions and Equations	Polynomial and Rational Functions	Exponential Functions, Logarithms, and Data Modeling	Binomial Distributions and Statistical Inference
6	Patterns in Shape	Modeling and Optimization	Circles and Circular Functions	Surfaces and Cross Sections	Informatics
7	Quadratic Functions	Trigonometric Methods	Recursion and Iteration	Concepts of Calculus	Spatial Visualization and Representations
8	Patterns in Chance	Probability Distributions	Inverse Functions	Counting Methods and Induction	Mathematics of Democratic Decision-Making

== Evaluations, Research, and Reviews ==
Project and independent evaluations and many research studies have been conducted on Core-Plus Mathematics, including content analyses, case studies, surveys, small- and large-scale comparison studies, research reviews, and a longitudinal study.

=== Positive reviews ===
There are multiple research studies and evaluations in which students using Core-Plus Mathematics performed significantly better than comparison students on assessments of conceptual understanding, problem solving, and applications, and results were mixed for performance on assessments of by-hand calculation skills. Some of these studies were funded by the National Science Foundation, the same organization that funded the development of Core-Plus Mathematics program.

==== Large-scale comparison studies ====
A three-part study of Core-Plus Mathematics and more conventional curricula were reported by researchers at the University of Missouri. The research was conducted as part of the Comparing Options in Secondary Mathematics: Investigating Curricula project, supported by the National Science Foundation under REC-0532214. The research was reported in the March and July 2013 issues of the Journal for Research in Mathematics Education and in the December 2013 issue of the International Journal of Science and Mathematics Education. The three studies examined student achievement in schools in 5 geographically dispersed states. The first study involved 2,161 students in 10 schools in first-year high school mathematics courses, the second study involved 3,258 students in 11 schools in second-year mathematics courses, and the third study involved 2,242 students in 10 schools in third-year mathematics courses. Results in the first study showed that Core-Plus Mathematics students scored significantly higher on all three end-of-year outcome measures: a test of common objectives, a problem solving and reasoning test, and a standardized achievement test. Results in the second study showed that Core-Plus Mathematics students scored significantly higher on a standardized achievement test, with no differences on the other measures. Results in the third study showed that Core-Plus Mathematics students scored significantly higher on a test of common objectives, with no differences on the other measure.

==== Other comparison studies ====
A study conducted by Schoen and Hirsch, two authors of Core-Plus Mathematics, reported that students using early versions of Core-Plus Mathematics did as well as or better than those in traditional single-subject curricula on all measures except paper-and-pencil algebra skills.

A study on field-test versions of Core-Plus Mathematics, supported by a grant from the National Science Foundation (Award MDR 9255257) and published in 2000 in the Journal for Research in Mathematics Education, reported that students using the first field-test versions of Core-Plus Mathematics scored significantly better on tests of conceptual understanding and problem solving, while Algebra II students in conventional programs scored significantly better on a test of paper-and-pencil procedures.

Other studies reported that Core-Plus Mathematics students displayed qualities such as engagement, eagerness, communication, flexibility, and curiosity to a much higher degree than did students who studied from more conventional programs. A review of research in 2008 concluded that there were modest effects for Core-Plus Mathematics on mostly standardized tests of mathematics.

With regard to achievement of students in minority groups, an early peer-reviewed paper documenting the performance of students from under-represented groups using Core-Plus Mathematics reported that at the end of each of Course 1, Course 2, and Course 3, the posttest means on standardized mathematics achievement tests of Core-Plus Mathematics students in all minority groups (African Americans, Asian Americans, Hispanics, and Native/Alaskan Americans) were greater than those of the national norm group at the same pretest levels. Hispanics made the greatest pretest to posttest gains at the end of each course. A later comparative study reported that Hispanic high school students using Core-Plus Mathematics made modest gains compared to the performance of students with other demographic backgrounds.

Regarding preparation for college, studies of SAT and ACT test results reported that Core-Plus Mathematics students performed significantly better than comparison students on the SAT and performed as well on the ACT. Several studies examined the subsequent college mathematics performance of students who used different high school textbook series. These studies did not detect any differential effect of high school curriculum on placement in college mathematics courses, in subsequent performance, or in course-taking patterns.

==== Reviews of instructional materials and programs ====
EdReports, an independent nonprofit, recently completed evidenced-based reviews of K-12 instructional materials. In their analysis of Core-Plus Mathematics Courses 1–3, the three-year core program was found to meet expectations for alignment to the high school Common Core State Standards for Mathematics in terms of content, focus, and coherence, and in terms of rigor and mathematical practices. The Core-Plus Mathematics instructional materials also met EdReports criteria that the materials are well designed and reflect effective lesson structure and pacing.

In an in-depth analysis by The Center for Research on Reform in Education at Johns Hopkins University, Core-Plus Mathematics was given a "moderate" evidence rating, and is the only comprehensive three-year high school mathematics program to be rated at any level (strong, moderate, or promising) for meeting federal ESSA Standards for Evidence in terms of promoting student achievement.

==== Other research studies ====
In terms of core content development, a study comparing the development of quadratic equations in the Korean national curriculum and Core-Plus Mathematics found that some quadratic equation topics are developed earlier in Korean textbooks, while Core-Plus Mathematics includes more problems requiring explanations, various representations, and higher cognitive demand.

Several studies have analyzed the teacher's role in Core-Plus Mathematics.

=== Negative reviews ===
In November 1999, David Klein, professor of mathematics at California State University, Northridge, sent an open letter to the U.S. Department of Education, in response to the U.S. Department of Education Expert Panel in Mathematics and Science designation of Core-Plus Mathematics as "exemplary." Klein's open letter urged the Department of Education to withdraw its recommendations of the several reform mathematics programs including Core-Plus Mathematics. The letter was co-signed by more than 200 American scientists and mathematicians.

Prof. Klein asserts that the mathematics programs criticized by the open letter had common features: they overemphasized data analysis and statistics, while de-emphasizing far more important areas of arithmetic and algebra. Many of the "higher-order thinking projects" turned out to be just aimless activities. The programs were obsessed with electronic calculators, and basic skills were disparaged.

Specifically, Core-Plus Mathematics was criticized for exhibiting "too shallow a coverage of traditional algebra, and a focus on highly contextualized work".

R. James Milgram, Professor of Mathematics at Stanford University, analyzed the program's effect on students in a top-performing high school. According to Milgram, "...there was no measure represented in the survey, such as ACT scores, SAT Math scores, grades in college math courses, level of college math courses attempted, where the students even met, let alone surpassed the comparison group [which used a more traditional program]."

==== Andover High School Survey ====
One of the first schools to pilot Core-Plus was Andover High School in Bloomfield Hills, Michigan, which was ranked one of America's "100 best" high schools. Andover stopped traditional mathematics in 1994 and began using Core-Plus Mathematics.

A survey conducted in 1997 of Andover graduates found that 96 percent of students who returned the survey said they were placed into “remedial math” in college. In a neighboring school, 62 percent of the students who returned the survey took remedial math in college. Activism by a group of parents caused Andover to return to offering a traditional math option. By 2000, half of students at Andover were taking Core-Plus and the other half were taking traditional math.

Students commented on the survey that Core Plus was one of the worst math programs and a waste of their time. They lamented never being taught "any of the basics and most are suffering in college math courses". They found themselves "completely unprepared" for understanding college math.

The survey study has been criticized for involving a self-selected sample, self-reported data, and biased survey methods. Data provided by the University of Michigan registrar at this same time indicated that in collegiate mathematics courses at the University of Michigan graduates of Core-Plus did as well as or better than graduates of a traditional mathematics curriculum. A later study (see below) found that graduates of the Core-Plus curriculum entering Michigan State University have placed into increasingly lower level mathematics courses as the implementation of the curriculum has progressed. This study and the published report have been criticized for design flaws and for drawing conclusions that are not supported by the data.

==== A study of Core-Plus students attending Michigan State University ====
In 2006, Richard O. Hill and Thomas H. Parker from Michigan State University (MSU) evaluated the effectiveness of the Core-Plus Mathematics Project in preparing the students for subsequent university mathematics. R. Hill and T. Parker analyzed the college mathematics records of students arriving at MSU from four high schools that implemented the Core-Plus Mathematics program between 1996 and 1999. They found a "disconnect" between the mathematics expectations that students encounter in K-12 education and those that they encounter in college. The effectiveness of Core-Plus and the other NSF-funded high school curricula programs became a significant issue for college mathematics faculty.

Core-Plus students placed into, and enrolled in, increasingly lower-level courses. The percentages of students who eventually passed a technical calculus course showed a statistically significant decline averaging 27 percent a year; this trend was accompanied by an obvious and statistically significant increase in percentages of students who placed into low-level and remedial algebra courses. Except for some top students, graduates of Core-Plus mathematics were struggling in college mathematics, earning below average grades. They were less well prepared than either graduates in the Control group (who came from a broad mix of curricula) or graduates of their own high schools before the implementation of Core-Plus mathematics.

==== Review by Prof. Harel ====
In 2009 professor of mathematics at the University of California, San Diego, Guershon Harel reviewed four high-school mathematics programs. The examined programs included Core-Plus Courses 1, 2, and 3. The examination focused on two topics in algebra and one topic in geometry, deemed by Prof. Harel central to the high school curriculum. The examination was intended "to ensure these topics are coherently developed, completely covered, mathematically correct, and provide students a solid foundation for further study in mathematics".

From the outset, Prof. Harel noted that the content presentation in Core-Plus program is unusual in that its instructional units, from the start to the end, are made of word problems involving "real-life" situations. This structure is reflected in the subtitle of the Core-Plus series: Contemporary Mathematics in Context. To review the program, it was necessary to go through all the problems in the core units and their corresponding materials in the Teacher's Edition. Despite the unconventional textbook structure, the language used by the Core-Plus program was found mathematically sound.

In the algebra section, fundamental theorems on linear functions and quadratic functions were found not justified, except for the quadratic formula. Theorems are often presented without proof.

Like in the algebra texts, the geometry text does not lead to a clear logical structure of the material taught. Because theoretical material is concealed within the text of the problems, "a teacher must identify all the critical problems and know in advance the intended structure to establish the essential mathematical progression. This task is further complicated by the fact that many critical problems appear in the homework sections. Important theorems in geometry are not justified. Moreover, with the way the material is sequenced, some of these theorems cannot be justified".

According to Prof. Harel, the Core-Plus program "excels in providing ample experience in solving application problems and in ensuring that students understand the meanings of the different parts of the modeling functions. The program also excels in its mission to contextualize the mathematics taught". However, it fails "to convey critical mathematical concepts and ideas that should and can be within reach for high school students".

==== Review by Prof. Wilson ====
Professor W. Stephen Wilson from Johns Hopkins University evaluated the mathematical development and coherence of the Core-Plus program in 2009. In particular, he examined "the algebraic concepts and skills associated with linear functions because they are a critical foundation for the further study of algebra", and evaluated how the program presents the theorem that the sum of the angles of a triangle is 180 degrees, "which is a fundamental theorem of Euclidean geometry and it connects many of the basics in geometry to each other".

Prof. Wilson noted that the major theme of the algebra portion of the program seems to involve creating a table from data, graphing the points from the table; given the table students are asked to find a corresponding function. In case of linear function, "at no point is there an attempt to show that the equation's graph really is a line. Likewise, there is never an attempt to show that a line graph comes from the usual form of a linear equation". Prof. Wilson considered this approach to be "a significant flaw in the mathematical foundation".

Quoting the textbook, "Linear functions relating two variables x and y can be represented using tables, graphs, symbolic rules, or verbal descriptions", Prof. Wilson laments that although this statement is true, "the essence of algebra involves abstraction using symbols".

Prof. Wilson says that the Core-Plus program "has a multitude of good problems, but never develops the core of the mathematics of linear functions. The problems are set in contexts and mathematics itself is rarely considered as a legitimate enterprise to investigate". The program lacks attention to algebraic manipulation" to the point that "symbolic algebra is minimized".

In regards to geometry portion, Prof. Wilson concludes that the program fails to build geometry up from foundations in a mathematically sound and coherent way". He stresses out that "one significant goal of a geometry course is to teach logic, and this program fails on that account".

Overall, the "unacceptable nature of geometry" and the fashion in which the program downplays "algebraic structure and skills" make the Core-Plus program unacceptable.

== Historical Controversy ==
Mathematics programs initially developed in the 1990s that were based on the NCTM's Curriculum and Evaluation Standards for School Mathematics, like Core-Plus Mathematics, have been the subject of controversy due to their differences from more conventional mathematics programs. In the case of Core-Plus Mathematics, there has been debate about (a) the international-like integrated nature of the curriculum, whereby each year students learn algebra, geometry, statistics, probability, and discrete mathematical modeling, as opposed to conventional U.S. curricula in which just a single subject is studied each year, (b) a concern that students may not adequately develop conventional algebraic skills, (c) a concern that students may not be adequately prepared for college, and (d) a mode of instruction that relies less on teacher lecture and demonstration and more on inquiry, problem solving in contextualized settings, and collaborative work by students.

For example, this debate led to some schools in Minnesota abandoning Core-Plus Mathematics in the early 2000s and returning to traditional mathematics curricula. In a master's degree research paper at the time, interviews with teachers at four schools that had dropped Core-Plus Mathematics suggested that many teachers "did not feel that Core-Plus emphasized mastering skills enough", while parents "felt that it did not prepare students for college" and some parents commented that the text was difficult to read. The author of the paper made suggestions for successful adoption of any new materials, including "don't rush the adoption process," have "continued professional development for all," and "school districts need to be proactive regarding parent questions."
