= Skip counting =

Educational mathematics technique

Skip counting is a mathematics technique taught as a kind of multiplication in reform mathematics textbooks such as TERC. In older textbooks, this technique is called counting by twos (threes, fours, etc.).

In skip counting by twos, a person can count to 10 by only naming every other even number: 2, 4, 6, 8, 10. Combining the base (two, in this example) with the number of groups (five, in this example) produces the standard multiplication equation: two multiplied by five equals ten.
