= Addison-Wesley Secondary Math: An Integrated Approach: Focus on Algebra =

Mathematics textbook

- Author: Randall Inners Charles, Alba Gonzalez Thompson
- Genre: Mathematics
- Publication date: 1996
- ISBN: 9780201867404

Addison-Wesley Secondary Math: An Integrated Approach: Focus on Algebra is an 812-page-long algebra textbook published in 1996. The lead authors are Randall I. Charles and Alba González Thompson; three other authors and ten program conceptualizers are credited on the title page. The textbook is noted for containing significant content outside the traditional field of mathematics. The real-life context, intended to make mathematics more relevant, includes chili recipes, ancient myths, and photographs of famous people.

Although it was a widely used textbook, it made headlines when it was dubbed "rain forest algebra" by critics.

== Structure ==
Each of the 10 chapters is composed of two or three themes, or "superlessons", each of which connects the algebraic content to another discipline. Each superlesson begins with an opening page with discussion questions relating to the theme. Critics of the program have cited these questions as evidence of the lack of emphasis on mathematics in the book.

Examples of questions cited:

- What other kinds of pollution besides air pollution might threaten our planet? [page 163, in the introduction to 3-1 Functional Relationships]
- Each year the Oilfield Chili Appreciation Society holds a chili cook-off. . . . 1. The chili cook-off raises money for charity. Describe some ways the organizers could raise money in the cook-off. 2. What is the hottest kind of pepper that you have eaten? People who have tasted them agree that cayenne peppers are hotter than pimento peppers. How would you set up a hotness scale for peppers? . . . . [page 217, in the introduction to 4-1 Solving Linear Equations]
- What role should zoos play in today's society? . . . . [page 233, in the introduction to 4-2 Other Techniques for Solving Linear Equations]

Exercises within lessons that relate to the theme have also been criticized. One example:

- Creative Writing The zoo sponsors a creative writing contest for high school students. The topic for the essay this year is "Why should we save an endangered species? The prize winners will split a $9000 scholarship. The prize for first place is 3 times that of third place. The prize for second place is $1500 more than that for third place. a. How much money will be awarded for each place? b. If you were in charge of awarding the prizes, would you have awarded the same amounts for the places. Why or why not? c. Suppose you are a judge. What would you use as criteria for judging the essay? [page 253]

== Criticism ==
Richard Askey, of the University of Wisconsin Department of Mathematics, reviewed Focus on Algebra in Contemporary Issues in Mathematics Education, commenting, "The book is over 800 pages long. ... If more significant material were covered than in other countries, or if the explanations were better, the length might not be a problem. Unfortunately, neither is the case. ... The first thing one notices when looking at Focus on Algebra is the lavish use of color illustrations, frequently irrelevant to the mathematics being discussed. ... Focus on Algebra is far from the worst of the new books. However, it contains a representative sample of what is being called 'a mile wide and an inch deep'."

Senator Robert Byrd, Democrat from West Virginia, joined critics of reform mathematics on the floor of the Senate by dubbing Focus on Algebra "whacko algebra". It had received an "F" grade on a report card produced by Mathematically Correct, a back-to-basics group, who claimed that it had no algebraic content on the first hundred pages.

== See also ==
- Mathematically Correct
- Traditional mathematics
- NCTM standards
