= Recall of facts =

Education value

Recall of facts is a value of education which is to be de-emphasized in reform of science according to new American national curriculum standards. Recall of facts is often associated with rote learning.

== Science in the United States ==
According to "The Influence of the National Science Education Standards on the Science Curriculum" by James D. Ellis of the University of Kansas:

"Teaching for depth of understanding of important science concepts is preferred, rather than recall of science facts. Teaching less content in depth is better than covering too much content superficially."

== Mathematics in the United States ==
In North America, the 1989 NCTM math Standards called for decreased emphasis (but not elimination) of memorization of facts. The revised 2000 Standards and the 2006 Focal Points made it clear that students should still memorize basic addition and multiplication facts. Newer editions of textbooks such as Everyday Mathematics stress that

Helping children learn the basic facts is an important goal in the Everyday Mathematics Curriculum. Most children should have developed an automatic recall of the basic addition and subtraction facts by the end of the second grade. They should also know most of their 1, 2, 5, and 10 multiplication facts by this time. By the end of the fourth grade most students should have an automatic recall of all the basic multiplication facts and be familiar with the basic division facts. Multiplication and division facts are reinforced at the beginning of fifth grade.
