= Reys =

Reys may refer to:

== People ==
- Barbara Reys (born 1953), American mathematics educator
- Frank Reys (1931–1984), Australian jockey
- Michael Reys (born 1966), Dutch slalom canoer
- Rita Reys (1924–2013), Dutch jazz singer

== Places ==
- Reys, Iran
