= Multiplication table =

Mathematical table

Multiplication table from 1 to 10 drawn to scale with the upper-right half labelled with prime factorisations

In mathematics, a multiplication table (sometimes, less formally, a times table) is a mathematical table used to define a multiplication operation for an algebraic system.

The decimal multiplication table was traditionally taught as an essential part of elementary arithmetic around the world, as it lays the foundation for arithmetic operations with base-ten numbers. Many educators believe it is necessary to memorize the table up to 9 × 9.

== History ==
=== Pre-modern times ===
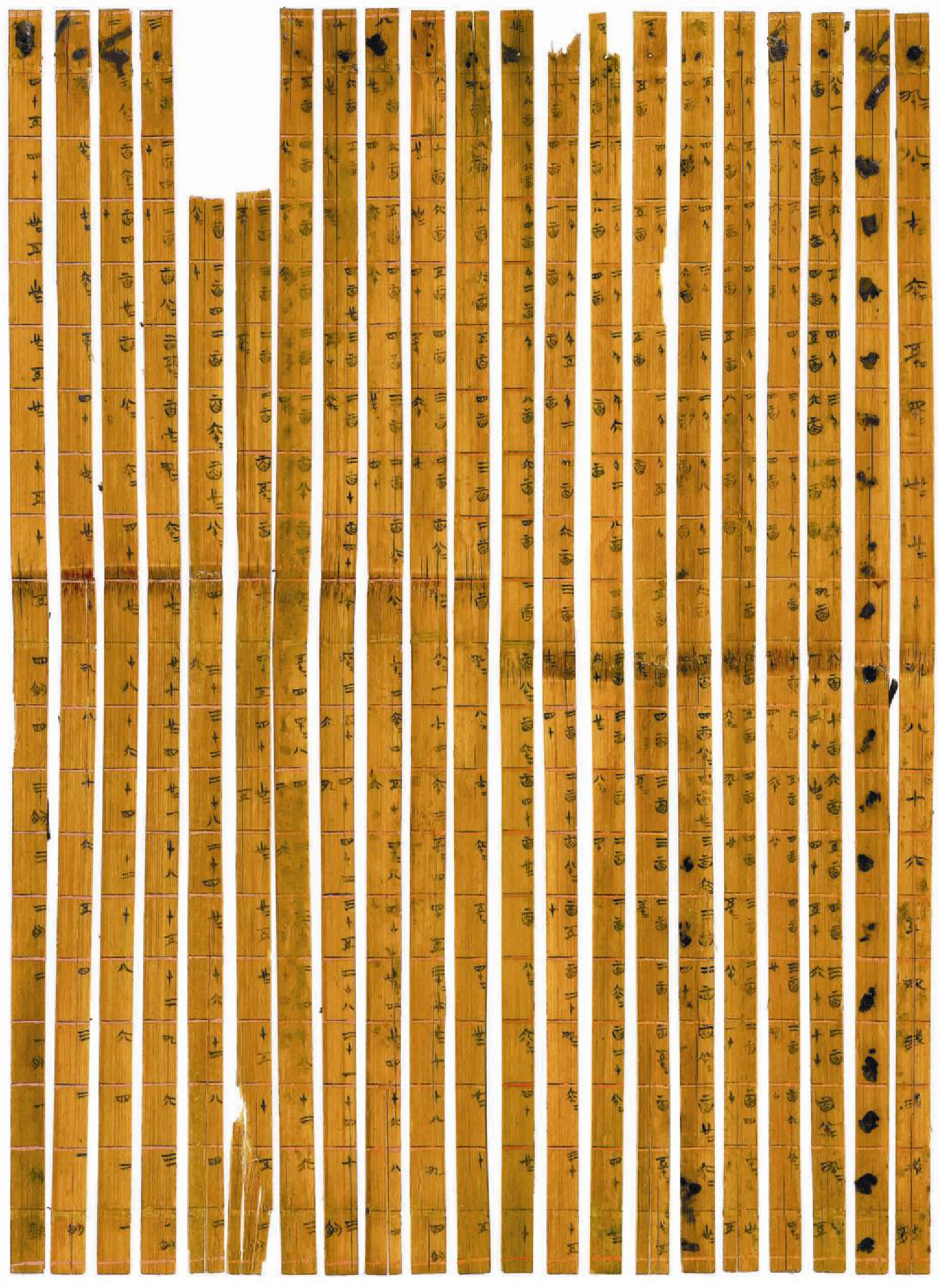
The Tsinghua Bamboo Slips, Chinese Warring States era decimal multiplication table of 305 BC

The oldest known multiplication tables were used by the Babylonians about 4000 years ago. However, they used a base of 60. The oldest known tables using a base of 10 are the Chinese decimal multiplication table on bamboo strips dating to about 305 BC, during China's Warring States period.

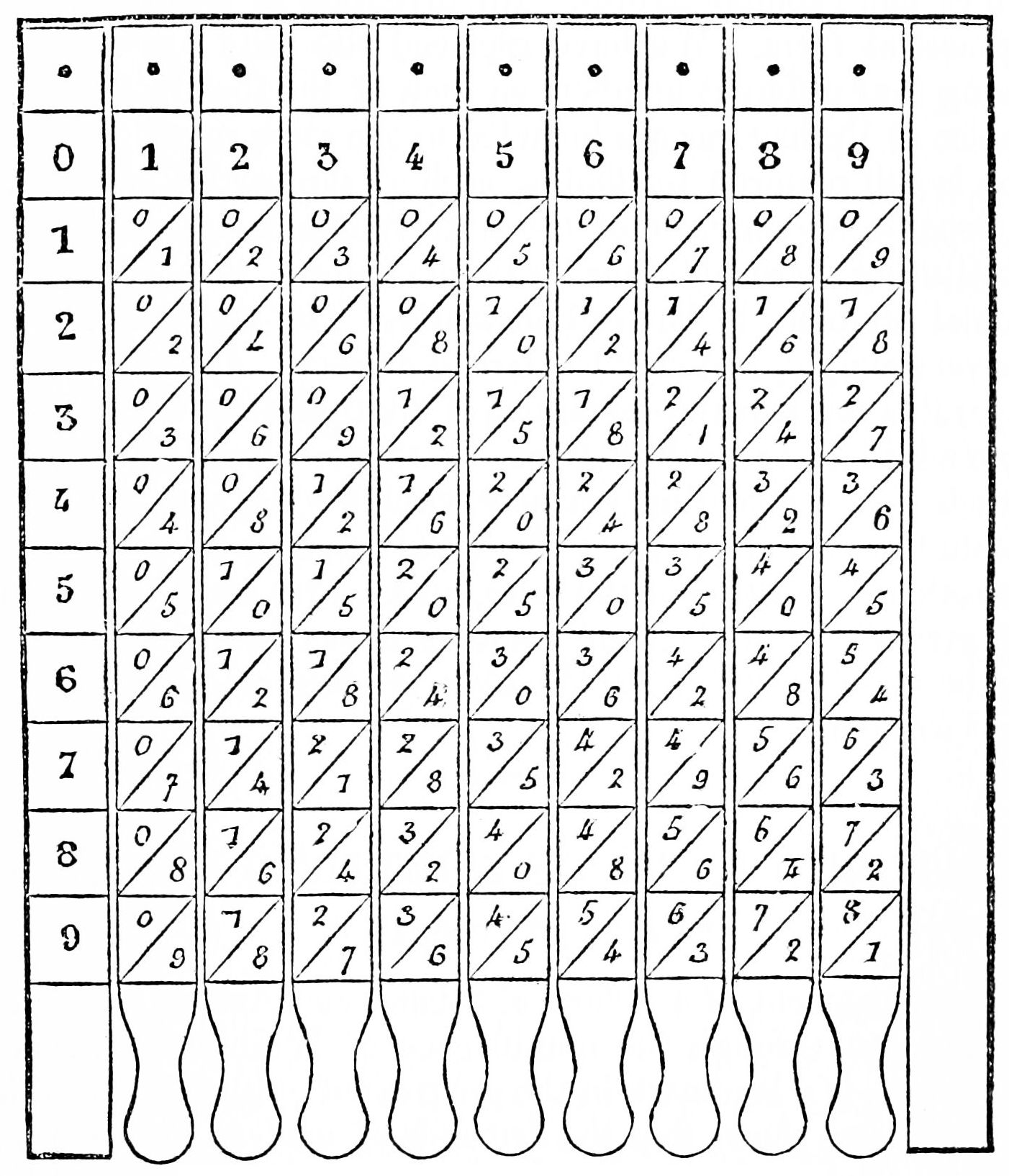
"Table of Pythagoras" on Napier's bones

The multiplication table is sometimes attributed to the ancient Greek mathematician Pythagoras (570–495 BC). It is also called the Table of Pythagoras in many languages (for example French, Italian and Russian), sometimes in English. The Greco-Roman mathematician Nichomachus (60–120 AD), a follower of Neopythagoreanism, included a multiplication table in his Introduction to Arithmetic, whereas the oldest surviving Greek multiplication table is on a wax tablet dated to the 1st century AD and currently housed in the British Museum.

In 493 AD, Victorius of Aquitaine wrote a 98-column multiplication table which gave (in Roman numerals) the product of every number from 2 to 50 times and the rows were "a list of numbers starting with one thousand, descending by hundreds to one hundred, then descending by tens to ten, then by ones to one, and then the fractions down to 1/144."

=== Modern times ===
In his 1820 book The Philosophy of Arithmetic, mathematician John Leslie published a table of "quarter-squares" which could be used, with some additional steps, for multiplication up to 1000 × 1000. Leslie also recommended that young pupils memorize the multiplication table up to 50 × 50.

In 1897, August Leopold Crelle published Calculating tables giving the products of every two numbers from one to one thousand which is a simple multiplication table for products up to 1000 × 10000.

Tables showing all products of numbers from 1 to 10 or 1 to 12 are the sizes most commonly found in primary schools. The table below shows products up to 12 × 12:

×	1	2	3	4	5	6	7	8	9	10	11	12
1	1	2	3	4	5	6	7	8	9	10	11	12
2	2	4	6	8	10	12	14	16	18	20	22	24
3	3	6	9	12	15	18	21	24	27	30	33	36
4	4	8	12	16	20	24	28	32	36	40	44	48
5	5	10	15	20	25	30	35	40	45	50	55	60
6	6	12	18	24	30	36	42	48	54	60	66	72
7	7	14	21	28	35	42	49	56	63	70	77	84
8	8	16	24	32	40	48	56	64	72	80	88	96
9	9	18	27	36	45	54	63	72	81	90	99	108
10	10	20	30	40	50	60	70	80	90	100	110	120
11	11	22	33	44	55	66	77	88	99	110	121	132
12	12	24	36	48	60	72	84	96	108	120	132	144

The common multi-digit multiplication algorithms taught in school break that problem down into a sequence of single-digit multiplication and multi-digit addition problems. Single-digit multiplication can be summarized in a 100-entry table of all products of digits from 0 to 9. Because 0 × a = 0 for any number a, the rows and columns for multiplication by 0 are typically left out. Multiplication of integers is commutative, a × b = b × a. Therefore, the table is symmetric across its main diagonal, and can be reduced to 45 entries by only showing entries a × b where a ≥ b, as shown below. The table could be reduced further (to 36 entries) by leaving off rows and columns for multiplication by 1, the multiplicative identity, which satisfies a × 1 = a.

1	1								
2	2	4							
3	3	6	9						
4	4	8	12	16					
5	5	10	15	20	25				
6	6	12	18	24	30	36			
7	7	14	21	28	35	42	49		
8	8	16	24	32	40	48	56	64	
9	9	18	27	36	45	54	63	72	81
×	1	2	3	4	5	6	7	8	9

The traditional rote learning of multiplication was based on memorization of columns in the table, arranged as follows.

1 × 1 = 1; 2 × 1 = 2; 3 × 1 = 3; 4 × 1 = 4; 5 × 1 = 5; 6 × 1 = 6; 7 × 1 = 7; 8 × 1 = 8; 9 × 1 = 9; 10 × 1 = 10; 11 × 1 = 11; 12 × 1 = 12	1 × 2 = 2; 2 × 2 = 4; 3 × 2 = 6; 4 × 2 = 8; 5 × 2 = 10; 6 × 2 = 12; 7 × 2 = 14; 8 × 2 = 16; 9 × 2 = 18; 10 × 2 = 20; 11 × 2 = 22; 12 × 2 = 24	1 × 3 = 3; 2 × 3 = 6; 3 × 3 = 9; 4 × 3 = 12; 5 × 3 = 15; 6 × 3 = 18; 7 × 3 = 21; 8 × 3 = 24; 9 × 3 = 27; 10 × 3 = 30; 11 × 3 = 33; 12 × 3 = 36	1 × 4 = 4; 2 × 4 = 8; 3 × 4 = 12; 4 × 4 = 16; 5 × 4 = 20; 6 × 4 = 24; 7 × 4 = 28; 8 × 4 = 32; 9 × 4 = 36; 10 × 4 = 40; 11 × 4 = 44; 12 × 4 = 48
1 × 5 = 5; 2 × 5 = 10; 3 × 5 = 15; 4 × 5 = 20; 5 × 5 = 25; 6 × 5 = 30; 7 × 5 = 35; 8 × 5 = 40; 9 × 5 = 45; 10 × 5 = 50; 11 × 5 = 55; 12 × 5 = 60	1 × 6 = 6; 2 × 6 = 12; 3 × 6 = 18; 4 × 6 = 24; 5 × 6 = 30; 6 × 6 = 36; 7 × 6 = 42; 8 × 6 = 48; 9 × 6 = 54; 10 × 6 = 60; 11 × 6 = 66; 12 × 6 = 72	1 × 7 = 7; 2 × 7 = 14; 3 × 7 = 21; 4 × 7 = 28; 5 × 7 = 35; 6 × 7 = 42; 7 × 7 = 49; 8 × 7 = 56; 9 × 7 = 63; 10 × 7 = 70; 11 × 7 = 77; 12 × 7 = 84	1 × 8 = 8; 2 × 8 = 16; 3 × 8 = 24; 4 × 8 = 32; 5 × 8 = 40; 6 × 8 = 48; 7 × 8 = 56; 8 × 8 = 64; 9 × 8 = 72; 10 × 8 = 80; 11 × 8 = 88; 12 × 8 = 96
1 × 9 = 9; 2 × 9 = 18; 3 × 9 = 27; 4 × 9 = 36; 5 × 9 = 45; 6 × 9 = 54; 7 × 9 = 63; 8 × 9 = 72; 9 × 9 = 81; 10 × 9 = 90; 11 × 9 = 99; 12 × 9 = 108	1 × 10 = 10; 2 × 10 = 20; 3 × 10 = 30; 4 × 10 = 40; 5 × 10 = 50; 6 × 10 = 60; 7 × 10 = 70; 8 × 10 = 80; 9 × 10 = 90; 10 × 10 = 100; 11 × 10 = 110; 12 × 10 = 120	1 × 11 = 11; 2 × 11 = 22; 3 × 11 = 33; 4 × 11 = 44; 5 × 11 = 55; 6 × 11 = 66; 7 × 11 = 77; 8 × 11 = 88; 9 × 11 = 99; 10 × 11 = 110; 11 × 11 = 121; 12 × 11 = 132	1 × 12 = 12; 2 × 12 = 24; 3 × 12 = 36; 4 × 12 = 48; 5 × 12 = 60; 6 × 12 = 72; 7 × 12 = 84; 8 × 12 = 96; 9 × 12 = 108; 10 × 12 = 120; 11 × 12 = 132; 12 × 12 = 144

This form of writing the multiplication table in columns with complete number sentences is still used in some countries, such as Colombia, Bosnia and Herzegovina, instead of the modern grids above.

== Patterns in the tables ==
There is a pattern in the multiplication table that can help people to memorize the table more easily. It uses the figures below:

→					→
↑	1	2	3	↓	↑	2		4	↓
↑	4	5	6	↓	↑				↓
↑	7	8	9	↓	↑	6		8	↓
←					←
	0		5				0
Figure 1: Odd					Figure 2: Even

Cycles of the unit digit of multiples of integers ending in 1, 3, 7 and 9 (upper row), and 2, 4, 6 and 8 (lower row) on a telephone keypad

Figure 1 is used for multiples of 1, 3, 7, and 9. Figure 2 is used for the multiples of 2, 4, 6, and 8. These patterns can be used to memorize the multiples of any number from 0 to 10, except 5. As you would start on the number you are multiplying, when you multiply by 0, you stay on 0 (0 is external and so the arrows have no effect on 0, otherwise 0 is used as a link to create a perpetual cycle). The pattern also works with multiples of 10, by starting at 1 and simply adding 0, giving you 10, then just apply every number in the pattern to the "tens" unit as you would normally do as usual to the "ones" unit.

For example, to recall all the multiples of 7:

1. Look at the 7 in the first picture and follow the arrow.
2. The next number in the direction of the arrow is 4. So think of the next number after 7 that ends with 4, which is 14.
3. The next number in the direction of the arrow is 1. So think of the next number after 14 that ends with 1, which is 21.
4. After coming to the top of this column, start with the bottom of the next column, and travel in the same direction. The number is 8. So think of the next number after 21 that ends with 8, which is 28.
5. Proceed in the same way until the last number, 3, corresponding to 63.
6. Next, use the 0 at the bottom. It corresponds to 70.
7. Then, start again with the 7. This time it will correspond to 77.
8. Continue like this.

== In abstract algebra ==
Tables can also define binary operations on groups, fields, rings, and other algebraic systems. In such contexts they are called Cayley tables.

For every natural number n, addition and multiplication in Z_{n}, the ring of integers modulo n, is described by an n by n table. For example, the tables for Z_{5} are:

+	0	1	2	3	4
0	0	1	2	3	4
1	1	2	3	4	0
2	2	3	4	0	1
3	3	4	0	1	2
4	4	0	1	2	3

×	0	1	2	3	4
0	0	0	0	0	0
1	0	1	2	3	4
2	0	2	4	1	3
3	0	3	1	4	2
4	0	4	3	2	1

For other examples, see group.

=== Hypercomplex numbers ===
Visual analogue showing cycles of multiplication of i (red), j (green) and k (blue)

Hypercomplex number multiplication tables show the non-commutative results of multiplying two hypercomplex imaginary units. The simplest example is that of the quaternion multiplication table:

Quaternion multiplication table
↓ × →	1	i	j	k
1	1	i	j	k
i	i	−1	k	−j
j	j	−k	−1	i
k	k	j	−i	−1

== Chinese and Japanese multiplication tables ==
The Chinese multiplication table consists of eighty-one terms. It was historically called the nine-nine table, because in ancient times it started with 9 × 9: nine nines beget eighty-one, eight nines beget seventy-two, etc. It was known in China as early as the Spring and Autumn period, and survived through the age of the abacus; pupils in elementary school today still must memorize it. A shorter version of the table consists of only forty-five sentences:

九九乘法口诀表 (The Nine-nine multiplication table)
×	1 一 yī	2 二 èr	3 三 sān	4 四 sì	5 五 wǔ	6 六 liù	7 七 qī	8 八 bā	9 九 jiǔ
1 一 yī	一一 得一								
2 二 èr	一二 得二	二二 得四							
3 三 sān	一三 得三	二三 得六	三三 得九						
4 四 sì	一四 得四	二四 得八	三四 十二	四四 十六					
5 五 wǔ	一五 得五	二五 一十	三五 十五	四五 二十	五五 二十五				
6 六 liù	一六 得六	二六 十二	三六 十八	四六 二十四	五六 三十	六六 三十六			
7 七 qī	一七 得七	二七 十四	三七 二十一	四七 二十八	五七 三十五	六七 四十二	七七 四十九		
8 八 bā	一八 得八	二八 十六	三八 二十四	四八 三十二	五八 四十	六八 四十八	七八 五十六	八八 六十四	
9 九 jiǔ	一九 得九	二九 十八	三九 二十七	四九 三十六	五九 四十五	六九 五十四	七九 六十三	八九 七十二	九九 八十一

Mokkan discovered at Heijō Palace suggest that the multiplication table may have been introduced to Japan through Chinese mathematical treatises such as the Sunzi Suanjing, because their expression of the multiplication table share the character 如 in products less than ten. Chinese and Japanese share a similar system of eighty-one short, easily memorable sentences taught to students to help them learn the multiplication table up to 9 × 9. In current usage, the sentences that express products less than ten include an additional particle in both languages. In the case of modern Chinese, this is 得 (dé); and in Japanese, this is が (ga). This is useful for those who practice calculation with a suanpan or a soroban, because the sentences remind them to shift one column to the right when inputting a product that does not begin with a tens digit. In particular, the Japanese multiplication table uses non-standard pronunciations for numbers in some specific instances (such as the replacement of san roku with saburoku; indicated in bold below).

The Japanese multiplication table
×	1 ichi	2 ni	3 san	4 shi	5 go	6 roku	7 shichi	8 ha	9 ku
1 in	in'ichi ga ichi	inni ga ni	insan ga san	inshi ga shi	ingo ga go	inroku ga roku	inshichi ga shichi	inhachi ga hachi	inku ga ku
2 ni	ni ichi ga ni	ni nin ga shi	ni san ga roku	ni shi ga hachi	ni go jū	ni roku jūni	ni shichi jūshi	ni hachi jūroku	ni ku jūhachi
3 san	san ichi ga san	san ni ga roku	sazan ga ku	san shi jūni	san go jūgo	saburoku jūhachi	san shichi nijūichi	sanpa nijūshi	san ku nijūshichi
4 shi	shi ichi ga shi	shi ni ga hachi	shi san jūni	shi shi jūroku	shi go nijū	shi roku nijūshi	shi shichi nijūhachi	shi ha sanjūni	shi ku sanjūroku
5 go	go ichi ga go	go ni jū	go san jūgo	go shi nijū	go go nijūgo	go roku sanjū	go shichi sanjūgo	go ha shijū	gokku shijūgo
6 roku	roku ichi ga roku	roku ni jūni	roku san jūhachi	roku shi nijūshi	roku go sanjū	roku roku sanjūroku	roku shichi shijūni	roku ha shijūhachi	rokku gojūshi
7 shichi	shichi ichi ga shichi	shichi ni jūshi	shichi san nijūichi	shichi shi nijūhachi	shichi go sanjūgo	shichi roku shijūni	shichi shichi shijūku	shichi ha gojūroku	shichi ku rokujūsan
8 hachi	hachi ichi ga hachi	hachi ni jūroku	hachi san nijūshi	hachi shi sanjūni	hachi go shijū	hachi roku shijūhachi	hachi shichi gojūroku	happa rokujūshi	hakku shichijūni
9 ku	ku ichi ga ku	ku ni jūhachi	ku san nijūshichi	ku shi sanjūroku	ku go shijūgo	ku roku gojūshi	ku shichi rokujūsan	ku ha shichijūni	ku ku hachijūichi

== Warring States decimal multiplication bamboo slips ==
A bundle of 21 bamboo slips dated 305 BC in the Warring States period in the Tsinghua Bamboo Slips (清華簡) collection is the world's earliest known example of a decimal multiplication table.

A modern representation of the Warring States decimal multiplication table used to calculate 12 × 34.5

== Standards-based mathematics reform in the US ==
In 1989, the National Council of Teachers of Mathematics (NCTM) developed new standards which were based on the belief that all students should learn higher-order thinking skills, which recommended reduced emphasis on the teaching of traditional methods that relied on rote memorization, such as multiplication tables. Widely adopted texts such as Investigations in Numbers, Data, and Space (widely known as TERC after its producer, Technical Education Research Centers) omitted aids such as multiplication tables in early editions. NCTM made it clear in their 2006 Focal Points that basic mathematics facts must be learned, though there is no consensus on whether rote memorization is the best method. In recent years, a number of nontraditional methods have been devised to help children learn multiplication facts, including video-game style apps and books that aim to teach times tables through character-based stories.

In 2024, the recommendation to learn the multiplication table was removed from the California Mathematics Curriculum Framework.

== See also ==
- IBM 1620, an early computer that used tables stored in memory to perform addition and multiplication
- Ready reckoner
