= Mathematically Correct =

US-based website about math education reform, now defunct

Mathematically Correct was a U.S.-based website created by educators, parents, mathematicians, and scientists who were concerned about the direction of reform mathematics curricula based on NCTM standards. Created in 1997, it was a frequently cited website in the so-called Math wars, and was actively updated until 2003.

== History ==
Although Mathematically Correct had a national scope, much of its focus was on opposing mathematics curricula prevalent in California in the mid-1990s. When California adopted more traditional mathematics texts (2001–2002), the group shifted to reviewing the new textbooks. Finding them adequate, the website largely went dormant.

The site maintained a large section of critical articles and reviews for various math programs, many developed from National Science Foundation–funded research and based on the 1989 Curriculum and Evaluation Standards for School Mathematics of the National Council of Teachers of Mathematics.

Its main contention was that reform textbooks often omitted or replaced traditional methods and concepts with new terminology and procedures. For example, some reports suggested that students completing the Core-Plus Mathematics Project might be unprepared for college-level courses. Other programs criticized included those aimed at elementary students, such as Dale Seymour Publications (TERC) Investigations in Numbers, Data, and Space and Everyday Learning's Everyday Mathematics.

After Mathematically Correct's review of the programs, many have undergone revisions and are now with different publishers. Other programs, such as Mathland have been terminated.

== Reviews by the site ==
Publications with poor reviews from Mathematically Correct include:

- Addison-Wesley Secondary Math: An Integrated Approach: Focus on Algebra
- Core-Plus Mathematics Project
- Investigations in Numbers, Data, and Space
- Mathland
- NCTM's 1989 Standards produced by the professional association for teachers of mathematics. The Standards encouraged increased emphasis on problem solving and decreased attention to algorithms learned by rote. It was perceived by some critics to recommend elimination of standard algorithms.

Curricula not judged deficient by Mathematically Correct include:

- Singapore math – Math textbooks used in Singapore
- Saxon math – A program created by a retired Air Force officer who had been highly critical of mathematics teaching reforms from the late 1960s to 1990s.

State tests that were judged deficient by Mathematically Correct are:

- CLAS – A defunct California test, based on NCTM standards and California mathematics standards replaces in 2002
- WASL – Washington State standards
