= Clas =

Clas or CLAS may refer to:

- Clas (given name)
- Clas (ecclesiastical settlement), a medieval church in Wales
- CLAS (education), a standards-based assessment used in California
- CLAS detector, the CEBAF Large Acceptance Spectrometer at the Thomas Jefferson National Accelerator Facility
- CESG Listed Advisor Scheme, a system of IT Security specialists working on government computer systems in the UK
- University of Florida College of Liberal Arts and Sciences
- University of Iowa College of Liberal Arts and Sciences
- Center for Latin American Studies - University of Pittsburgh
- Community Legal Assistance Society, a legal aid office in Vancouver, British Columbia.
- Conjugated linoleic acids
- Centimeter-Level Augmentation Service (Asian regional Precise Point Positioning via GNSS augmentation for Real-time kinematic positioning)
