= Traditional mathematics =

Method of mathematics education

Traditional mathematics (sometimes classical math education) was the predominant method of mathematics education in the United States in the early-to-mid 20th century. This contrasts with non-traditional approaches to math education. Traditional mathematics education has been challenged by several reform movements over the last several decades, notably new math, a now largely abandoned and discredited set of alternative methods, and most recently reform or standards-based mathematics based on NCTM standards, which is federally supported and has been widely adopted, but subject to ongoing criticism.

== Traditional methods ==
The topics and methods of traditional mathematics are well documented in books and open source articles of many nations and languages. Major topics covered include:

- Elementary arithmetic
- Addition
- Carry
- Subtraction
- Multiplication
- Multiplication table
- Division
- Long division
- Arithmetic with fractions
- Lowest common denominator
- Arithmetic mean
- Volume

In general, traditional methods are based on direct instruction where students are shown one standard method of performing a task such as decimal addition, in a standard sequence. A task is taught in isolation rather than as only a part of a more complex project. By contrast, reform books often postpone standard methods until students have the necessary background to understand the procedures. Students in modern curricula often explore their own methods for multiplying multi-digit numbers, deepening their understanding of multiplication principles before being guided to the standard algorithm. Parents sometimes misunderstand this approach to mean that the children will not be taught formulas and standard algorithms and therefore there are occasional calls for a return to traditional methods. Such calls became especially intense during the 1990s. (See Math wars.)

A traditional sequence early in the 20th century would leave topics such as algebra or geometry entirely for high school, and statistics or calculus until college, but newer standards introduce the basic principles needed for understanding these topics very early. For example, most American standards now require children to learn to recognize and extend patterns in kindergarten. This very basic form of algebraic reasoning is extended in elementary school to recognize patterns in functions and arithmetic operations, such as the distributive law, a key principle for doing high school algebra. Most curricula today encourage children to reason about geometric shapes and their properties in primary school as preparation for more advanced reasoning in a high school geometry course. Current standards require children to learn basic statistical ideas such as organizing data with bar charts. More sophisticated concepts such as algebraic expressions with numbers and letters, geometric surface area and statistical means and medians occur in sixth grade in the newest standards.

== Criticism of traditional math ==
Criticism of traditional mathematics instruction originates with advocates of alternative methods of instruction, such as Reform mathematics. These critics cite studies, such as The Harmful Effects of Algorithms in Grades 1–4, which found specific instances where traditional math instruction was less effective than alternative methods. Advocates of alternative methods argue that traditional methods of instruction over-emphasize memorization and repetition, and fail to promote conceptual understanding or to present math as creative or exploratory. Critics also sometimes cite the fact that history of mathematics often focuses on European advancements and methods developed by men, thus ignoring equity issues and potentially alienating minorities and women.

The general consensus of large-scale studies that compare traditional mathematics with reform mathematics is that students in both curricula learn basic skills to about the same level as measured by traditional standardized tests, but the reform mathematics students do better on tasks requiring conceptual understanding and problem solving. Critics of traditional methods note that only a small percentage of students achieve the highest levels of mathematics achievement such as calculus. Some argue that too few students master even algebra.

The use of calculators became common in United States math instruction in the 1980s and 1990s. Critics have argued that calculator work, when not accompanied by a strong emphasis on the importance of showing work, allows students to get the answers to many problems without understanding the math involved. However, others such as Conrad Wolfram argue for a more radical use of computer-based math in a complete departure from traditional math.

Mathematics educators, such as Alan Schoenfeld, question whether traditional mathematics actually teach mathematics as understood by professional mathematicians and other experts. Instead, Schoenfeld implies, students come to perceive mathematics as a list of disconnected rules that must be memorized and parroted. Indeed, research suggests that certain approaches to traditional mathematics instruction impresses upon students an image of mathematics as closed to imagination and discovery, an image in clear opposition to how experts view the field.

== Traditional mathematics texts ==
In general, math textbooks which focus on instruction in standard arithmetic methods can be categorized as a traditional math textbook. Reform math textbooks will often focus on conceptual understanding, usually avoiding immediate instruction of the standard algorithms and frequently promoting student exploration and discovery of the relevant mathematics. The following current texts are often cited as good for those wishing for a traditional approach, often also favored by homeschoolers and private schools.

- Saxon math
- Modern Curriculum Press

== Recent trends ==
In the United States there has been general cooling of the "Math wars" during the first decade of the 21st century as reform organizations such as the National Council of Teachers of Mathematics and national committees, such as the National Mathematics Advisory Panel convened by George W. Bush, have concluded that elements of both traditional mathematics (such as mastery of basic skills and some direct instruction) and reform mathematics (such as some student-centered instruction and an emphasis on conceptual understanding and problem-solving skills) need to be combined for best instruction. The Common Core Standards, which have been adopted by most states since 2011, adopt such a mediating position for curricula, requiring students to achieve both procedural fluency and conceptual understanding. The Common Core does not endorse any particular teaching method, but does suggest students solve word problems using a variety of representations.

== Organizations promoting traditional mathematics ==
- Mathematically Correct a website which supports traditional mathematics
- NYC HOLD a New York-based organization of teachers, professional mathematicians, parents and others which has been extremely active in recent years in working for adoption of mastery-based, traditional math programs
- Illinois Loop – extensive web coverage of math issues and specific math programs
- Where's The Math – a website which supports traditional mathematics and more focused standards for the state of Washington
