= Addition and subtraction =

Addition and subtraction may refer to:

- Addition
- Subtraction

Addition and Subtraction is a 1900 French film.
