= Douglas Clements =

American scholar

Douglas H. Clements is an American scholar in the field of early mathematics education. Previously a preschool and kindergarten teacher, his research centers on the learning and teaching of early mathematics, computer applications for mathematics teaching, and scaling up successful educational interventions. Clements has contributed to the writing of educational standards including the Common Core State Standards, the NCTM's Principles and Standards for School Mathematics and the NCTM's 2006 Curriculum Focal Points for Prekindergarten through Grade 8 Mathematics.

As of 2021, he is Distinguished University Professor and the Kennedy Endowed Chair in Early Childhood Learning at the University of Denver and the co-director of the Marsico Institute for Early Learning. He was previously a SUNY Distinguished Professor at the University at Buffalo.

== Subitizing ==
Clements is notable for reviving interest in the importance of perceptual and conceptual subitizing in early childhood mathematics education. Perceptual subitizing is the ability to instantly recognise the number of objects in a small group, without counting. Conceptual subitizing is the ability to see a whole quantity as groups of smaller quantities (for example, seeing eight as two groups of four). When learning to count, young children use subitizing to develop their understanding of cardinality. They also use their conceptual subitizing and pattern recognition skills to develop their understanding of arithmetic and number sense.

== Building Blocks and Learning Trajectories ==
Together with Julie Sarama, Clements developed the Building Blocks curriculum and the Learning Trajectories approach to early mathematics education. Learning trajectories consist of a learning goal, a developmental path along which children develop to reach that goal, and a set of activities matched to each level in that learning path. Clements has evaluated this approach in randomized controlled trials and shown it to have a positive impact on children's learning. This research has influenced evidence reviews and teaching guidance produced by the Education Endowment Foundation in the UK and the What Works Clearinghouse in the USA.

== Personal life ==
Clements is married to fellow early mathematics researcher and collaborator Julie Sarama. He has four children: Luke Clements, Abby Clements, Leah Meredith, and Ryan Clements.
