= Mathland =

Discontinued elementary mathematics course

MathLand was one of several elementary mathematics curricula that were designed around the 1989 NCTM standards. It was developed and published by Creative Publications and was initially adopted by the U.S. state of California and schools run by the US Department of Defense by the mid-1990s. Unlike curricula such as Investigations in Numbers, Data, and Space, by 2007 Mathland was no longer offered by the publisher, and has since been dropped by many early adopters. Its demise may have been, at least in part, a result of intense scrutiny by critics (see below).

== Adoption ==
Mathland was among the math curricula rated as "promising" by an Education Department panel, although subsequently 200 mathematicians and scientists, including four Nobel Prize recipients and two winners of the Fields Medal, published a letter in the Washington Post deploring the findings of that panel. MathLand was adopted in many California school districts as its material most closely fit the legal mandate of the 1992 California Framework. That framework has since been discredited and abandoned as misguided and replaced by a newer standard based on traditional mathematics. It bears noting that the process by which the framework was replaced itself came under serious scrutiny.

== Concept ==
Mathland focuses on "attention to conceptual understanding, communication, reasoning and problem solving." Children meet in small groups and invent their own ways to add, subtract, multiply and divide, which spares young learners from "teacher-imposed rules." In the spirit of not chaining instruction to fixed content, MathLand does away with textbooks. A textbook as well as other practice books were available to reinforce concepts taught in the lesson.

== Standard arithmetic ==
MathLand does not teach standard arithmetic algorithms, including carrying and borrowing. Such methods familiar to adults are absent from the curriculum, and so would need to be supplemented if desired. The standard method for multi-digit multiplication is not presented until 6th grade, and then only as an example of how it is error-prone. Instead a Russian peasants' algorithm for calculating 13 × 18 = 234 is favored. By cutting and pasting various strips of paper, it can be solved by simply using 3 divisions, 3 multiplications, a cancellation, and an addition of three numbers.

Sixth graders are asked to solve following problem:

"I just checked out a library book that is 1,344 pages long! The book is due in 3 weeks. How many pages will I need to read a day to finish the book in time?"

Long division is not used to divide 1,344 by 21. Instead, the curriculum guide explains that "division in MathLand is not a separate operation to master, but rather a combination of successive approximations, multiplication, adding up and subtracting back, all held together with the students' own number sense."

== Criticisms ==
Debra J. Saunders of the San Francisco Chronicle calls Mathland a math curriculum that prefers not to give lessons with "predetermined numerical results." Kings County fourth-grade teacher Doug Swords says that 14 out of 18 teachers use MathLand only as a supplement. When asked if MathLand was helpful in teaching kids to multiply, he responded "No, quite frankly".

In a letter published in Stars and Stripes concerning the education of children by the Department of Defense, Denise McArthur wrote that "according to Dr. Wu, mathematics professor at U.C. Berkeley, the Interactive Math series is quite the worst math text I have ever come across". Another mathematician wrote, in the Notices of the AMS, "I respectfully urge the AMS leadership to withdraw its endorsement of the NCTM Standards. The Standards have paved the way for elementary pedagogies such as MathLand, which fail to develop the standard multiplication algorithm for elementary students". And another, "...the proposed MathLand materials, address neither our children's lack of basic skills nor their poor performance on tests ... it wholeheartedly embraces the philosophy of the "reform" movement ... a movement that is being seriously questioned by the mathematical and educational community ... it would be foolish to adopt something with such obvious inadequacies."

Mathland had fallen out of favor by the mid-2000s and was no longer offered by Creative Publications as of 2007.
