= Journal for Research in Mathematics Education =

- Discipline: Mathematics education
- Language: English
- Edited by: Ilana Horn

Publication details
- History: 1970-present
- Publisher: National Council of Teachers of Mathematics (United States)
- Frequency: 5/year
- Impact factor: 2.278 (2021)

Standard abbreviations
- ISO 4: J. Res. Math. Educ.

Indexing
- ISSN: 0021-8251 (print); 1945-2306 (web)
- LCCN: 74013519
- JSTOR: 00218251
- OCLC no.: 263599854

Links
- Journal homepage

The Journal for Research in Mathematics Education is a peer-reviewed academic journal covering the field of mathematics education. The journal is published by the National Council of Teachers of Mathematics in five issues a year. The editor-in-chief is Ilana Horn.

== Abstracting and indexing ==
The journal is abstracted and indexed in:

- Current Contents/Social and Behavioral Sciences
- DIALNET
- EBSCO databases
- Education Resources Information Center
- Scopus
- Social Sciences Citation Index

According to the Journal Citation Reports, the journal has a 2021 impact factor of 2.278.

== See also ==
- List of mathematics education journals
