= Common Core =

Educational initiative in the United States

The Common Core State Standards Initiative, also known as simply Common Core, was an American, multi-state educational initiative which began in 2008 with the goal of increasing consistency across state ELA and Math standards, or what K–12 students throughout the United States should know in English language arts and mathematics at the conclusion of each school grade. The initiative was sponsored by the National Governors Association and the Council of Chief State School Officers.

== Background ==
In the 1990s, a movement began in the U.S. to establish national educational standards for students across the country.

- (a) outlining what students were expected to know and do at each grade level
- (b) implementing ways to find out if they were meeting those standards.

This movement culminated in the passage of No Child Left Behind in 2002 which required states articulate ELA and math standards at each level. For some states, this required writing new standards. For others, it meant breaking down existing grade-band standards into grade by grade expectations.

== Development ==
In late 2008, the NGA convened a group to work on developing the standards. This team included David Coleman, William McCallum of the University of Arizona, Phil Daro, Douglas Clements and Student Achievement Partners founders Jason Zimba and Susan Pimentel to write standards in the areas of English, language arts, and mathematics. Announced on June 1, 2009, the initiative's stated purpose was to "provide a consistent, clear understanding of what students are expected to learn, so teachers and parents know what they need to do to help them". Additionally, "The standards are designed to be robust and relevant to the real world, reflecting the knowledge and skills that our young people need for success in college and careers", which should place American students in a position in which they can compete in a global economy.

Work groups composed of representatives from higher education, K-12 education, teachers, and researchers drafted the Common Core State Standards. The work groups consulted educators, administrators, community and parent organizations, higher education representatives, the business community, researchers, civil rights groups, and states for feedback on each of the drafts.

The standards were copyrighted by NGA Center for Best Practices (NGA Center) and the CCSSO, which controls use of and licenses the standards. The NGA Center and CCSSO do this by offering a public license which is used by State Departments of Education. The license states that use of the standards must be "in support" of the Common Core State Standards Initiative. It also requires attribution and a copyright notice, except when a state or territory has adopted the standards "in whole".

When the CCSS was originally published, there was no intention to publish a common set of standards for English language proficiency development (ELPD). Instead, it was indicated that the ELPD standards would be left to individual states. However, the need for more guidance quickly became apparent, and led to the creation of several initiatives to provide resources to states and educators, including

- WIDA, which is a consortium that produces standardized tests aimed at English Language Learners (ELLs), more properly known as English as an Additional Language (EAL) students, that is used in multiple states. It is still updating its standards in order to align with CCSS.
- An English language proficiency development framework from The Council of Chief State School Officers, which assists states in revising their ELPD standards to align to both the CSS and Next Generation Science Standards.
- Both the National Board of Professional Teaching Standards (NBPTS) and the TESOL International Association are involved in establishing the standards for ESL instruction, but as of yet there is not a standardized set of qualifications across the country for ESL instruction.

The U.S. Department of Education has since funded two grants to develop the next generation of ELPD assessments, which must measure students’ proficiency against a set of common ELPD standards, which in turn correspond to the college/career-ready standards in English, language arts, and mathematics. The new assessment system must also:

- Be based on a common definition of English language learner adopted by all consortium states.
- Include diagnostic (e.g., screener, placement) and summative assessments.
- Assess English language proficiency across the four language domains (reading, writing, speaking, and listening) for each grade level from kindergarten through grade 12.
- Produce results that indicate whether individual students have attained a level and complexity of English language proficiency that is necessary to fully participate in academic instruction in English.
- Be accessible to all ELLs, except those who are eligible for alternate assessments based on alternate academic standards.
- Use technology to the maximum extent appropriate to develop, administer, and score assessments.

== Adoption ==
Forty-six states and the District of Columbia initially joined the Common Core State Standards Initiative; Texas, Virginia, Alaska, and Nebraska did not. Minnesota adopted the English Language Arts standards but not the Mathematics standards. Following pushback and reductions in financial support, the project lost momentum and at least 12 states introduced legislation to prohibit implementation. Eventually, multiple states that initially adopted the Common Core Standards, such as Indiana, Arizona, Oklahoma, South Carolina, and Florida, decided to repeal or replace them. New York State would eventually replace their version of the Common Core Standards with The Next Generation Learning Standards.

Standards were released for mathematics and English language arts on June 2, 2010, with a majority of states adopting the standards in the subsequent months. States were given an incentive to adopt the Common Core Standards through the possibility of competitive federal Race to the Top grants. U.S. President Barack Obama and U.S. Secretary of Education Arne Duncan announced the Race to the Top competitive grants on July 24, 2009, as a motivator for education reform. To be eligible, states had to adopt "internationally benchmarked standards and assessments that prepare students for success in college and the work place." Though states could adopt other college- and career-ready standards and still be eligible, they were awarded extra points in their Race to the Top applications if they adopted the Common Core standards by August 2, 2010. Forty-one states made the promise in their application. Virginia and Texas were two states that chose to write their own college and career-ready standards, and were subsequently eligible for Race to the Top. Development of the Common Core Standards was funded by the governors and state schools chiefs, with additional support from the Bill and Melinda Gates Foundation, Pearson Publishing Company, the Charles Stewart Mott Foundation, and others.

The Every Student Succeeds Act, passed in December 2015, replaced No Child Left Behind Act, and prohibited the Department of Education from attempting to "influence, incentivize, or coerce State adoption of the Common Core State Standards ... or any other academic standards common to a significant number of States."

Other content areas adopted a national approach to learning standards, such as the Next Generation Science Standards, released in April 2012 and were subsequently adopted by many states. They are not directly related to the Common Core standards, but their content can be cross-connected to the Common Core mathematical and English Language Arts standards.

== English Language Arts standards ==
The stated goal of the English Language Arts and Literacy in History/Social Studies, Science, and Technical Subjects standards is to ensure that students are college and career ready in literacy no later than the end of high school. There are five key components to the standards for English and Language Arts: Reading, Writing, Speaking and Listening, Language, and Media and Technology. The essential components and breakdown of each of these key points within the standards are as follows:

Reading

- As students advance through each grade, there is an increased level of complexity to what students are expected to read and there is also a progressive development of reading comprehension so that students can gain more from what they read.
- Teachers, school districts, and states are expected to decide on the appropriate curriculum, but sample texts are included. Molly Walsh of Burlington Free Press notes an appendix (of state standards for reading material) that lists "exemplar texts" from works by noted authors such as Ovid, Voltaire, William Shakespeare, Ivan Turgenev, Edgar Allan Poe, Robert Frost, W. B. Yeats, Nathaniel Hawthorne, and the more contemporary, including, Amy Tan, Atul Gawande and Julia Alvarez.
- There is some critical content for all students – classic myths and stories from around the world, foundational U.S. documents, seminal works of American literature, and the writings of Shakespeare – but the rest is left up to the states and the districts.
- Standards for Reading Foundational Skills are described for kindergarten to grade five. They include the areas of print concepts, phonological awareness, phonics and word recognition, and fluency. Specific teaching suggestions and research are contained in the Appendices, where “phonics” is referred to as “Phoneme-Grapheme Correspondences”.

Writing

- The driving force of the writing standards is logical arguments based on claims, solid reasoning, and relevant evidence. The writing also includes opinion writing even within the K–5 standards.
- Short, focused research projects, similar to the kind of projects students will face in their careers, as well as long-term, in-depth research is another piece of the writing standards. This is because written analysis and the presentation of significant findings are critical to career and college readiness.
- The standards also include annotated samples of student writing to help determine performance levels in writing arguments, explanatory texts, and narratives across the grades.

Speaking and listening

- Although reading and writing are the expected components of an English language arts curriculum, standards are written so that students gain, evaluate, and present complex information, ideas, and evidence specifically through listening and speaking.
- There is also an emphasis on academic discussion in one-on-one, small-group, and whole-class settings, which can take place as formal presentations or informal discussions during student collaboration.

Language

- The standards expect students to use formal English in their writing and speaking, but also recognize that colleges and 21st-century careers will require students to make wise, skilled decisions about how to express themselves through language in a variety of contexts.
- Vocabulary and conventions are their own strand because these skills extend across reading, writing, speaking, and listening.

Media and technology

- Since media and technology are intertwined with every student's life and in school in the 21st century, skills related to media use, which includes the analysis and production of various forms of media, are also included in these standards.
- The standards include instruction in keyboarding, but do not mandate the teaching of cursive handwriting.

== Mathematics standards ==
The stated goal of the mathematics standards is to achieve greater focus and coherence in the curriculum. This is largely in response to the criticism that American mathematics curricula are "a mile wide and an inch deep".

The mathematics standards include Standards for Mathematical Practice and Standards for Mathematical Content.

=== Standards for Mathematical Practice ===
The Standards mandate that eight principles of mathematical practice be taught:

1. Make sense of problems and persevere in solving them.
2. Reason abstractly and quantitatively.
3. Construct viable arguments and critique the reasoning of others.
4. Model with mathematics.
5. Use appropriate tools strategically.
6. Attend to precision.
7. Look for and make use of structure.
8. Look for and express regularity in repeated reasoning.

The practices are adapted from the five process standards of the National Council of Teachers of Mathematics and the five strands of proficiency in the U.S. National Research Council's Adding It Up report. These practices are to be taught in every grade from kindergarten to twelfth grade. Details of how these practices are to be connected to each grade level's mathematics content are left to local implementation of the Standards.

=== Standards for Mathematical Content ===
The standards lay out the mathematics content that should be learned at each grade level from kindergarten to Grade 8 (age 13–14), as well as the mathematics to be learned in high school. The standards do not dictate any particular pedagogy or what order topics should be taught within a particular grade level. Mathematical content is organized in a number of domains. At each grade level there are several standards for each domain, organized into clusters of related standards.

Mathematics domains at each grade level
Domain	Kindergarten	Grade 1	Grade 2	Grade 3	Grade 4	Grade 5	Grade 6	Grade 7	Grade 8
Counting and Cardinality	X								
Operations and Algebraic Thinking	X	X	X	X	X	X			
Number and Operations in Base 10	X	X	X	X	X	X			
Measurement and Data	X	X	X	X	X	X			
Geometry	X	X	X	X	X	X	X	X	X
Number and Operations—Fractions				X	X	X			
Ratios and Proportional Relationships							X	X	
The Number System							X	X	X
Expressions and Equations							X	X	X
Statistics and Probability							X	X	X
Functions									X

In addition to detailed standards (of which there are 21 to 28 for each grade from kindergarten to eighth grade), the standards present an overview of "critical areas" for each grade.

There are six conceptual categories of content to be covered at the high school level:

- Number, and quantity;
- Algebra;
- Functions;
- Modeling;
- Geometry;
- Statistics and probability.

Some topics in each category are indicated only for students intending to take more advanced, optional courses such as calculus, advanced statistics, or discrete mathematics. Even if the traditional sequence is adopted, functions and modeling are to be integrated across the curriculum, not taught as separate courses. Mathematical Modeling is a Standard for Mathematical Practice (see above), and is meant to be integrated across the entire curriculum beginning in kindergarten. The modeling category does not have its own standards; instead, high school standards in other categories which are intended to be considered part of the modeling category are indicated in the standards with a star symbol.

Each of the six high school categories includes a number of domains. For example, the "number and quantity" category contains four domains: the real number system; quantities; the complex number system; and vector and matrix quantities. The "vector and matrix quantities" domain is reserved for advanced students, as are some of the standards in "the complex number system".

In high school (Grades 9 to 12), the standards do not specify which content is to be taught at each grade level, nor does the Common Core prescribe how a particular standard should be taught. Up to Grade 8, the curriculum is integrated; students study four or five different mathematical domains every year. The standards do not dictate whether the curriculum should continue to be integrated in high school with study of several domains each year (as is done in other countries), or whether the curriculum should be separated out into separate year-long algebra and geometry courses (as has been the tradition in most U.S. states). An appendix to the standards describes four possible pathways for covering high school content (two traditional and two integrated), but states are free to organize the content any way they want.

=== Key shifts ===
The Common Core State Standards for Mathematics shifted the way the United States teaches math in three core ways. They built on the pre-existing standards to emphasize the skills and knowledge students will not only need in college, but in their career and in life as well. The key shifts are:

1. Greater focus on fewer topics
2. Coherence: Linking topics and thinking across grades
3. Rigor: Pursue conceptual understanding, procedural skills and fluency, and application with equal intensity

As an example, here is the description of one of the key shifts, a greater focus on fewer topics:

The Common Core calls for greater focus in mathematics. Rather than racing to cover many topics in a mile-wide, inch deep curriculum, the standards ask math teachers to significantly narrow and deepen the way time and energy are spent in the classroom. This means focusing deeply on the major work of each grade as follows:

- In grades K-2: Concepts, skills, and problem solving related to addition and subtraction
- In grades 3-5: Concepts, skills, and problem solving related to multiplication and division of whole numbers and fractions
- In grade 6: Ratios and proportional relationships, and early algebraic expressions and equations
- In grade 7: Ratios and proportional relationships, and arithmetic of rational numbers
- In grade 8: Elementary algebra and linear functions

This focus will help students gain strong foundations, including a solid understanding of concepts, a high degree of procedural skill and fluency, and the ability to apply the math they know to solve problems inside and outside the classroom.

== Assessment ==
The impetus for assessment was not a function of the Common Core project, but to ensure states' continued compliance with the testing mandates of No Child Left Behind which required standards-aligned assessments in math and ELA in grades 3-8 and once again in high school. Two consortiums formed to create multi-state assessments, taking two different approaches. The final decision of which assessment to use was determined by individual state education agencies. Both of these consortiums proposed computer-based exams that include fewer selected and constructed response test items, unlike most states' existing No Child Left Behind tests.

- The PARCC RttT Assessment Consortium comprises the 19 jurisdictions of Arizona, Arkansas, Colorado, District of Columbia, Florida, Illinois, Indiana, Kentucky, Louisiana, Maryland, Massachusetts, Mississippi, New Jersey, New Mexico, New York, Ohio, Pennsylvania, Rhode Island, and Tennessee. Their approach focuses on computer-based "through-course assessments" in each grade together with streamlined end-of-year tests. (PARCC refers to "Partnership for Assessment of Readiness for College and Careers" and RttT refers to the Race to the Top.)
- The second consortium, called the Smarter Balanced Assessment Consortium, comprised 31 states and territories (as of January 2014) focusing on creating "adaptive online exams". Member states include Alaska, California, Connecticut, Delaware, Hawaii, Idaho, Iowa, Maine, Michigan (which uses the M-Step), Missouri, Montana, Nevada, New Hampshire, North Carolina, North Dakota, Oregon, Pennsylvania, South Carolina, South Dakota, U.S. Virgin Islands, Vermont, Washington, West Virginia, Wisconsin, and Wyoming.

As of October 2015, SBAC membership was reduced to 20 members: California, Connecticut, Delaware, Hawaii, Idaho, Iowa, Maine, Michigan, Montana, New Hampshire, North Carolina, North Dakota, Oregon, South Dakota, U.S. Virgin Islands, The Bureau of Indian Education, Vermont, Washington, West Virginia, Wyoming.

While some states were working together to create a common, universal assessment based on the Common Core State Standards, other states choose to work independently or through these two consortiums to develop the assessment. Florida Governor Rick Scott directed his state education board to withdraw from PARCC. Georgia withdrew from the consortium test in July 2013 in order to develop its own. Michigan decided not to participate in Smarter Balanced testing. Oklahoma tentatively withdrew from the consortium test in July 2013 due to the technical challenges of online assessment. Utah withdrew from the Smarter Balanced Assessment Consortium in August 2012.

== Reception ==
The Common Core State Standards have drawn both support and criticism from politicians, analysts, and commentators. Teams of academics and educators from around the United States led the development of the standards, and additional validation teams approved the final standards. The teams drew on public feedback that was solicited throughout the process and that feedback was incorporated into the standards. The Common Core initiative only specifies what students should know at each grade level and describes the skills that they must acquire in order to achieve college or career readiness. Individual school districts are responsible for choosing curricula based on the standards. Textbooks bearing a Common Core label are not verified by any agency and may or may not represent the intent of the Common Core Standards. Some critics believe most current textbooks are not actually aligned to the Common Core, while others disagree.

The mathematicians Edward Frenkel and Hung-Hsi Wu wrote in 2013 that the mathematical education in the United States was in "deep crisis", caused by the way math was being taught in schools. Both agreed that math textbooks, which were widely adopted across the states, already create "mediocre de facto national standards". The texts, they said, were "often incomprehensible and irrelevant". The Common Core State Standards address these issues and "level the playing field" for students. They point out that adoption of the Common Core State Standards and how best to test students are two separate issues.

In 2012, Tom Loveless of the Brookings Institution called into question whether the standards will have any effect, and said that they "have done little to equalize academic achievement within states". In response to the standards, the libertarian Cato Institute claimed that "it is not the least bit paranoid to say the federal government wants a national curriculum." According to a study published by the Pioneer Institute, although the standards themselves are sound, their method of implementation has failed to deliver improvements in literacy, while numeracy has actually declined, due to the imposition of the mediocre curriculum sequences used in a number of mid-performing states, and the "progressive" teaching methods that are popular among Common Core developers. South Carolina Governor Nikki Haley said her state should not "relinquish control of education to the federal government, neither should we cede it to the consensus of other states."

Educational analysts from the Thomas B. Fordham Institute determined that the Common Core standards "are clearly superior to those currently in use in 39 states in math and 37 states in English. For 33 states, the Common Core is superior in both math and reading." In a follow-up study, researchers found that while some states were committed to updating their standards, more resources were still needed to ensure adequate implementation of those standards, including adequate course material, capacity to deliver assessments, and accountability systems.

According to the National Education Association, the Common Core State Standards are supported by 76% of its teacher members. Research from the Fordham Institute confirmed that many teachers support Common Core, but also found that the use of multiple methods to teach a single subject negatively impacted students' and parents' perceptions of these standards.

The Heritage Foundation argued in 2010 that the Common Core's focus on national standards would do little to fix deeply ingrained problems and incentive structures within the education system.

Marion Brady, a teacher, and Patrick Murray, an elected member of the school governing board in Bradford, Maine, wrote that Common Core drains initiative from teachers and enforces a "one-size-fits-all" curriculum that ignores cultural differences among classrooms and students. Diane Ravitch, former U.S. Assistant Secretary of Education and education historian, wrote in her book Reign of Error that the Common Core standards have never been field-tested and that no one knows whether they will improve education. Nicholas Tampio, Assistant Professor of Political Science at Fordham University, said that the standards emphasize rote learning and uniformity over creativity.

Michigan State University's Distinguished Professor William Schmidt wrote:

In my view, the Common Core State Standards in Mathematics (CCSSM) unquestionably represent a major change in the way U.S. schools teach mathematics. Rather than a fragmented system in which content is "a mile wide and an inch deep," the new common standards offer the kind of mathematics instruction we see in the top-achieving nations, where students learn to master a few topics each year before moving on to more advanced mathematics. It is my opinion that [a state] will best position its students for success by remaining committed to the Common Core State Standards and focusing their efforts on the implementation of the standards and aligned assessments.

The standards require certain critical content for all students, including classic myths and stories from around the world, America's Founding Documents, foundational American literature, and Shakespeare. In May 2013, the National Catholic Educational Association noted that the standards are a "set of high-quality academic expectations that all students should master by the end of each grade level" and are "not a national curriculum".

Advancing one Catholic perspective, over one hundred college-level scholars signed a public letter criticizing the Common Core for diminishing the humanities in the educational curriculum: The "Common Core adopts a bottom-line, pragmatic approach to education and the heart of its philosophy is, as far as we can see, that it is a waste of resources to 'over-educate' people," though the Common Core set only minimum—not maximum—standards. Mark Naison, Fordham University Professor, and co-founder of the Badass Teachers Association, raised a similar objection: "The liberal critique of Common Core is that this is a huge profit-making enterprise that costs school districts a tremendous amount of money, and pushes out the things kids love about school, like art and music".

As Common Core is implemented in New York, the new tests have been criticized. Some parents have said that the new assessments are too difficult and are causing too much stress, leading to an "opt-out movement" in which parents refuse to let their children take the tests.

Former governor Jeb Bush has said of opponents of the standards that while "criticisms and conspiracy theories are easy attention grabbers", he instead wanted to hear their solutions to the problems in American education. In 2014, Bobby Jindal wrote that "It has become fashionable in the news media to believe there is a right-wing conspiracy against Common Core."

Diane Ravitch has also stated:

The financial cost of implementing Common Core has barely been mentioned in the national debates. All Common Core testing will be done online. This is a bonanza for the tech industry and other vendors. Every school district must buy new computers, new teaching materials, and new bandwidth for the testing. At a time when school budgets have been cut in most states and many thousands of teachers have been laid off, school districts across the nation will spend billions to pay for Common Core testing. Los Angeles alone committed to spend $1 billion on iPads for the tests; the money is being taken from a bond issue approved by voters for construction and repair of school facilities. Meanwhile, the district has cut teachers of the arts, class size has increased, and necessary repairs are deferred because the money will be spent on iPads. The iPads will be obsolete in a year or two, and the Pearson content loaded onto the iPads has only a three-year license.

Writer Jonathan Kozol uses the metaphor "cognitive decapitation" to describe the unfulfilling educational experience students are going through due to the subjects that have been excluded in their curriculum as a result of the Common Core. He notes cognitive decapitation is often experienced in urban schools of color, while white children have the privilege to continue engaging in a creative curriculum that involves the arts.

In 2016, ACT, Inc., administrators of the ACT college readiness assessment, reported that there is a disconnect between what is emphasized in the Common Core and what is deemed important for college readiness by some college instructors. ACT has been a proponent of the Common Core Standards, and Chief Executive Officer Martin Roorda stated that "ACT's findings should not be interpreted as a rebuke of the Common Core."

== Impact ==
Kentucky was the first to implement the Common Core State Standards, and local school districts began offering new math and English curricula based on the standard in August 2010. In 2013, Time magazine reported that the high school graduation rate had increased from 80 percent in 2010 to 86 percent in 2013, test scores went up 2 percentage points in the second year of using the Common Core test, and the percentage of students considered to be ready for college or a career, based on a battery of assessments, went up from 34 percent in 2010 to 54 percent in 2013. According to Sarah Butrymowicz from The Atlantic,

Kentucky's experience over the past three school years suggests it will be a slow and potentially frustrating road ahead for the other states that are using the Common Core. Test scores are still dismal, and state officials have expressed concern that the pace of improvement is not fast enough. Districts have also seen varying success in changing how teachers teach, something that was supposed to change under the new standards.

The Common Core State Standards are considered to be more rigorous than the standards they replaced in Kentucky. Kentucky's old standards received a "D" in an analysis by the Thomas B. Fordham Institute. School officials in Kentucky believe it will take several more years to adjust to the new standards, which received an A− in math and a B+ in English from the Fordham Institute.

A working paper found that Common Core had a small but significant negative effect in grade 4 reading and grade 8 mathematics based on National Assessment of Educational Progress scores.

Implementation may be one of the major reasons why early results have been uneven. District administration and teachers have, in many cases, lacked the appropriate professional development, instructional materials, and Common Core-aligned assessments to support effective implementation of the new standards. As of 2023, 41 states continue to use the Common Core curriculum.

== Adoption and implementation by states ==
The chart below contains the adoption status of the Common Core State Standards as of March 21, 2019. Among the territories of the United States (not listed in the chart below), the U.S. Virgin Islands, Guam, the Northern Mariana Islands, and the American Samoa Islands have adopted the standards while Puerto Rico has not adopted the standards.

As of May 12, 2015, five states have repealed Common Core. Nine additional member states have legislation in some stage of the process that would repeal Common Core participation.

State	Adoption stance	Notes
Alabama	Repealed	State school board voted to drop the program.
Alaska	Non-member	
Arizona	Repealed	The Arizona State Board of Education voted to reject Common Core on October 26, 2015. The vote was 6–2 in favor of repeal.
Arkansas	Adopted	
California	Adopted	
Colorado	Adopted	
Connecticut	Adopted	
Delaware	Adopted	
District of Columbia	Adopted	
Florida	Repealed	Dropped in favor of "Florida State Standards", which are based on Common Core standards. On February 12, 2020, the Florida State Board of Education voted to rescind the Common Core standards and replace them with the Florida B.E.S.T. standards.
Georgia	Adopted	
Hawaii	Adopted	
Idaho	Repealed	Legislation replacing standards signed into law in 2022.
Illinois	Adopted	
Indiana	Repealed	Implementation paused by law for one year in May 2013 and under public review; withdrew in March 2014, but retained many of the standards.
Iowa	Adopted	
Kansas	Adopted	Defunding legislation passed Senate, narrowly failed in House in July 2013.
Kentucky	Adopted	
Louisiana	Adopted	Governor signed executive order to withdraw state from PARCC assessment program. (June 2014).
Maine	Adopted	
Maryland	Adopted	
Massachusetts	Adopted	Delayed Common Core testing for two years in November 2013. Ballot question on future of standards in 2016 has been ruled against by Massachusetts Supreme Judicial Court as of August 12, 2016.
Michigan	Adopted	Implementation was paused for a time but was approved to continue.
Minnesota	Partially adopted	English standards only, math standards rejected.
Mississippi	Adopted	Withdrew from PARCC testing on January 16, 2015.
Missouri	Withdrew	Withdrew in 2014 after legislative pressure from state lawmakers. Replaced with Missouri Learning Standards in 2018.
Montana	Adopted	
Nebraska	Non-member	
Nevada	Adopted	
New Hampshire	Adopted	
New Jersey	Repealed	Adopted New Jersey Student Learning Standards in lieu of Common Core beginning in the 2017–2018 school year.
New Mexico	Adopted	
New York	Adopted	Full implementation of assessment delayed until 2022.
North Carolina	Adopted	
North Dakota	Adopted	
Ohio	Adopted	
Oklahoma	Repealed	Legislation restoring state standards signed June 5, 2014.
Oregon	Adopted	
Pennsylvania	Adopted	Paused implementation in May 2013.
Rhode Island	Adopted	
South Carolina	Repealed	A bill to repeal the Standards beginning in the 2015–2016 school year was officially signed by Governor Nikki Haley in June 2014 after deliberation in the state legislature.
South Dakota	Repealed	State Board of Education Standards phased out Common Core Math in 2026.
Tennessee	Repealed	Tennessee passed a law to phase out common core in 2016. The new standard, The Tennessee Academic Standards, were implemented in English and Math for the 2017/2018 school year.
Texas	Non-member	
Utah	Adopted	
Vermont	Adopted	
Virginia	Non-member	
Washington	Adopted	
West Virginia	Adopted	
Wisconsin	Adopted	
Wyoming	Adopted	

== See also ==
- New Math, controversial attempt to revise mathematics education in post-war United States.
- Outcome-based education
