= Nichomachus =

Ancient Greek playwright

Nichomachus (Ancient Greek: Νιχόμαχος Nikhómakhos) was a playwright who lived in Athens in the 5th century BC. He was a younger contemporary of Sophocles. Only the following titles and associated fragments of Nichomachus's plays have survived: Alcmaeon, Aletides, Alexander, Geryones, Eriphyle, Mysians, Neoptolemus, Polyxena, Teucer, and Tyndareos. He also wrote a play titled Oedipus.
