= Barbara Reys =

American mathematician

Barbara Jean Bestgen Reys (born 1953) is an American mathematics educator known for her research in number sense and mental calculation, for her mathematics textbooks, and for her leadership in developing curriculum standards for elementary school mathematics education. She is Curators Professor Emeritus at the University of Missouri, and a winner of the Lifetime Achievement Award of the National Council of Teachers of Mathematics.

== Education and career ==
Reys graduated from the College of the Ozarks in 1975. She worked as a high school mathematics teacher in Missouri from 1974 to 1977, as an elementary school demonstration teacher from 1979 to 1982, and as a junior high school mathematics teacher from 1984 to 1985.

Beginning with a master's degree in 1979, she studied mathematics education as a graduate student at the University of Missouri, completing her Ph.D. there in 1985. Her dissertation, supervised by Douglas Arthur Grouws, was Identification and Characterization of Mental Computation Algorithms Used by Seventh and Eighth Grade Students on Visually and Orally Presented Mental Computation Exercises.

In 1985, she joined the faculty of the department of curriculum and instruction (later the department of learning, teaching and curriculum) at the University of Missouri. She was named Lois Knowles Professor in 2006, and Curator's Professor in 2011.

She was president of the Association of Mathematics Teacher Educators from 2009 to 2011.

== Recognition ==
In 2014 the Association of Mathematics Teacher Educators named Reys as their Judith Jacob's Lecturer. In 2016, the National Council of Teachers of Mathematics gave her their Lifetime Achievement Award.

== Books ==
Reys' books include:

- Mathematics Curriculum: Issues, Trends, and Future Directions. Seventy-second Yearbook (edited with Robert Reys and Rheta Rubinstein, National Council of Teachers of Mathematics, 2010)
- Number Sense: Simple Effective Number Sense Experiences (4 vols., with Alistair McIntosh and Robert E. Reys, Dale Seymour Publications, 1997)
- Mental Math (3 vols., with Jack A. Hope, Larry Leutizinger, and Robert E. Reys, Dale Seymour Publications, 1988)
- Mathematics Unlimited (with Robert E. Reys and Arnold W. Webb, Holt Rinehart Winston, 1987)
- GUESS: Guide to Using Estimation Skills and Strategies (Dale Seymour Publications, 1983)
