= Rote learning =

Memorization technique based on repetition

A flashcards program (Anki)

Rote learning is a memorization technique based on repetition. The method rests on the premise that the recall of repeated material becomes faster the more one repeats it. Some of the alternatives to rote learning include meaningful learning, associative learning, spaced repetition and active learning.

== Versus critical thinking ==
Rote learning is widely used in the mastery of foundational knowledge. Examples of school topics where rote learning is frequently used include phonics in reading, the periodic table in chemistry, multiplication tables in mathematics, anatomy in medicine, cases or statutes in law, basic formulae in any science, etc. By definition, rote learning eschews comprehension, so by itself it is an ineffective tool in mastering any complex subject at an advanced level. For instance, one illustration of rote learning can be observed in preparing quickly for exams, a technique which may be colloquially referred to as "cramming".

Rote learning is sometimes disparaged with the derogative terms parrot fashion, regurgitation, cramming, or mugging because one who engages in rote learning may give the wrong impression of having understood what they have written or said. It is strongly discouraged by many new curriculum standards. For example, science and mathematics standards in the United States specifically emphasize the importance of deep understanding over the mere recall of facts, which is seen to be less important. The National Council of Teachers of Mathematics stated:

More than ever, mathematics must include the mastery of concepts instead of mere memorization and the following of procedures. More than ever, school mathematics must include an understanding of how to use technology to arrive meaningfully at solutions to problems instead of endless attention to increasingly outdated computational tedium.

However, advocates of traditional education have criticized the new American standards as slighting learning basic facts and elementary arithmetic, and replacing content with process-based skills. In math and science, rote methods are often used, for example to memorize formulas. There is greater understanding if students commit a formula to memory through exercises that use the formula rather than through rote repetition of the formula. Newer standards often recommend that students derive formulas themselves to achieve the best understanding. Nothing is faster than rote learning if a formula must be learned quickly for an imminent test and rote methods can be helpful for committing an understood fact to memory. However, students who learn with understanding are able to transfer their knowledge to tasks requiring problem-solving with greater success than those who learn only by rote.

On the other side, those who disagree with the inquiry-based philosophy maintain that students must first develop computational skills before they can understand concepts of mathematics. These people would argue that time is better spent practicing skills rather than in investigations inventing alternatives, or justifying more than one correct answer or method. In this view, estimating answers is insufficient and, in fact, is considered to be dependent on strong foundational skills. Learning abstract concepts of mathematics is perceived to depend on a solid base of knowledge of the tools of the subject. Thus, these people believe that rote learning is an important part of the learning process.

== In computer science ==
Rote learning is also used to describe a simple learning pattern used in machine learning, although it does not involve repetition, unlike the usual meaning of rote learning. The machine is programmed to keep a history of calculations and compare new input against its history of inputs and outputs, retrieving the stored output if present. This pattern requires that the machine can be modeled as a pure function — always producing same output for same input — and can be formally described as follows:

f($\ x_1 , x_2 , . . ., x_n$) → ($\ y_1 , y_2 , . . ., y_p$) → store (($\ x_1 , x_2 , . . ., x_n$),($\ y_1 , y_2, . . . , y_p$))

Rote learning was used by Samuel's Checkers on an IBM 701, a milestone in the use of artificial intelligence.

== Learning methods for school ==
The flashcard, outline, and mnemonic device are traditional tools for memorizing course material and are examples of rote learning.

== See also ==
- Oswego Movement – 19th-century American education movement
