= International Journal of Science and Mathematics Education =

- Discipline: Science education, mathematics education
- Language: English
- Edited by: Hsin-Kai Wu

Publication details
- History: 2004–present
- Publisher: Springer Science+Business Media on behalf of the National Science Council of Taiwan
- Frequency: Bimonthly
- Impact factor: 2.073 (2020)

Standard abbreviations
- ISO 4: Int. J. Sci. Math. Educ.

Indexing
- ISSN: 1571-0068 (print); 1573-1774 (web)
- OCLC no.: 474774121

Links
- Journal homepage; Online access; Online archive

The International Journal of Science and Mathematics Education is a bimonthly peer-reviewed academic journal published by Springer Science+Business Media on behalf of the National Science Council of Taiwan. It covers science and mathematics education topics and research methods, particularly ones with cross-curricular dimensions or which explore the area from different cultural perspectives. The journal was established in 2004 with Fou-Lai Lin (National Taiwan Normal University). The current editor-in-chief is Hsin-Kai Wu (National Taiwan Normal University).

== Abstracting and indexing ==
The journal is abstracted and indexed in:

- Current Contents/Social & Behavioral Sciences
- EBSCO
- MathEDUC
- Scopus
- Social Sciences Citation Index

According to the Journal Citation Reports, the journal has a 2020 impact factor of 2.073.
