= W. Stephen Wilson =

American mathematician

W. Stephen Wilson is a mathematician based in Johns Hopkins University specializing in homotopy theory.

Wilson received his Ph.D. from Massachusetts Institute of Technology in 1972 under the supervision of Franklin Paul Peterson.

In 2012, Wilson became a fellow of the American Mathematical Society.
