= CLAS (education) =

- Skills tested: Language, mathematics
- Year started: 1993
- Year terminated: c. 1995
- Regions: California

CLAS was a test and a standards-based assessment based on Outcomes Based Education principles given in California in the early 1990s. It was based on concepts of new standards such as whole language and reform mathematics. Instead of multiple choice tests with one correct answer, it used open written responses that were graded according to rubrics. Test takers would have to write about passages of literature that they were asked to read and relate the passage to their own experiences, or to explain how they found solutions to math problems that they were asked to solve. Such tests were thought to be fairer to students of all abilities.

The system debuted in 1993, when about 1 million students in fourth, eighth, and tenth grade took the exams, although only some of them were graded to save money. According to the Los Angeles Times, the system was originally nationally praised as an example of "'performance based' testing".

Failure rates among all groups, particularly minorities, was so high that it generated concern. It was terminated in 1995 by the governor after two years.

Minorities scored even lower than on standardized tests, huge numbers scored in the lowest categories, as open response questions with more than one answer proved to be even more difficult than multiple choice problems.

In September 1994, Pete Wilson vetoed a bill, introduced by Gary Hart, that would have continued CLAS for another five years and provided $24M in funding, and called on the California state legislature to enact another statewide testing program. According to Maureen DiMarco, Wilson vetoed this bill because it did not provide achievement scores for individual students, even though Wilson supported the CLAS exams overall.

Educators complained about mismanagement and problems with scoring the CLAS exams. Additionally, religious conservatives described some of the literary passages on the CLAS exams as being "anti-family" or "an invasion of students’ privacy". According to Debra Saunders, CLAS graders were told to give higher scores to students who answered a math problem about planting trees incorrectly but who wrote enthusiastic essays than to students who answered this problem correctly without writing an essay.

Maureen DiMarco testified to the California State Legislature in charge of the [CLAS] that no graders were allowed to give a "4" top score in mathematics in the first year. It was based on open responses scored holistically, so that the correct answer to how to share 5 apples among 4 people might be to give the 5th to a food bank.

It was replaced by STAR, which is a testing system based on traditional rigorous academic standards which largely discards the theory of outcome-based education which was widely rejected by the late 1990s in the United States.
