= Investigations in Numbers, Data, and Space =

U.S. reform mathematics curriculum

Investigations in Numbers, Data, and Space is a K–5 mathematics curriculum, developed at TERC Inc. in Cambridge, Massachusetts, United States. The curriculum is often referred to as Investigations or simply TERC. Patterned after the NCTM standards for mathematics, it is among the most widely used of the new reform mathematics curricula. As opposed to referring to textbooks and having teachers impose methods for solving arithmetic problems, the TERC program uses a constructivist approach that encourages students to develop their own understanding of mathematics. The curriculum underwent a major revision in 2005–2007.

== History ==
Investigations was developed between 1990 and 1998. It was just one of a number of reform mathematics curricula initially funded by a National Science Foundation grant. The goals of the project raised opposition to the curriculum from critics (both parents and mathematics teachers) who objected to the emphasis on conceptual learning instead of instruction in more recognized specific methods for basic arithmetic..

The goal of the Investigations curriculum is to help all children understand the fundamental ideas of number and arithmetic, geometry, data, measurement and early algebra. Unlike traditional methods, the original edition did not provide student textbooks to describe standard methods or provide solved examples. Instead, students were guided to develop their own invented algorithms through working with concrete representations of number such as manipulatives and drawings as well as more traditional number sentences. Additional activities include journaling, cutting and pasting, interviewing (for data collection) and playing conceptual games.

Investigations released its second edition for 2006 that continues its focus on the core value of teaching for understanding. The revised version has further emphasis on basic skills and computation to complement the development of place value concepts and number sense. It is also easier for teachers to use since the format is more user friendly, though some districts have failed to carefully implement the second edition as well, and moved back to textbooks that teach traditional arithmetic methods.

== Research ==
A systematic review of research into Investigations was conducted by the U.S. Department of Education, Institute of Education Sciences and published as part of the What Works Clearinghouse in February 2013. This found "potentially positive effects" on mathematics achievement, supported by a "medium to large" evidence base.

A variety of measures of student achievement and learning including state-mandated standardized tests, research-based interview protocols, items from research studies published in peer-reviewed journals and specially constructed paper-and-pencil tests have been used to evaluate the effectiveness of Investigations

Research featured at the TERC website states that students who use Investigations, among other things, 'do as well or better than students using other curricula.' To support the assertion that children do better when they are not taught traditional arithmetic, Anne Goodrow, in her PhD thesis at Tufts University, compared subtraction strategies of students taught traditional methods with those who used constructivist methods with Investigations curriculum. Although negative numbers are not taught in the 2nd grade, "constructivist" student subtracting 9 from 28 explains that "8 minus 9 equals negative 1" and then argues that "-1 plus 20 is the same as 20-1 and equals 19." On the basis of this, and of the average score of this group of 10 students, the author concluded that "although they did not receive instruction in the use of the standard algorithms, the children in the Constructivist group were the most successful at both two-digit addition and subtraction." Many research reports demonstrating the success of the program are criticized by opponents of this curriculum as having poor methodology or for being conducted by the publisher. NSF-sponsored curricula are required to conduct and report such studies, something that is not required of traditional mathematics textbooks. See also a recent study conducted with the revised edition, for more evidence of efficacy.

Some school districts report their own data about success with the program.

== Criticism ==
Investigations initially was commercially successful. But parents and math educators have criticized its lack of traditional arithmetic content, of decimal math, of multiplication tables, of division and multiplication of fractions, or even of addition and subtraction of ordinary fractions apart from a small subset, its emphasis on "kindergarten activities" (cutting, folding, taping, etc.) in class and homework, its lack of a traditional textbook; its incompatibility with high-school and international mathematics methods; its non-traditional homework assignments; its high cost (a concern mainly of home-schooling parents); and other factors.

A common complaint is that the curriculum does not teach any of traditional arithmetic methods familiar to those taught in other nations and to parents with as little as an elementary-school education. The critics assert that "the TERC computational methods are cumbersome, inefficient, and only work for carefully selected simple problems" and that "conscious thought is regularly required for both TERC method selection and TERC method execution" even at the simplest levels, thus precluding automaticity and the ability to focus conscious thought on higher-level cognitive tasks later on. TERC defenders' response is that the traditional arithmetic methods familiar to Americans are not necessarily those used in other nations. Research has shown that students are capable of developing algorithms that are as correct, efficient, and generalizable as the "standard" algorithms.

A common parent complaint is that there is no recognizable arithmetic and that homework is frequent and very time-consuming, with some tasks requiring help from family members and cutting, pasting, and coloring, whereas a traditional worksheet may take little time. Other critics claim that there is not enough homework, and children should simply be given a procedure and told to practice it on a large number of exercises.

=== Non-traditional materials and content ===
- Student materials included in the 2002 Grade 5 package for TERC Investigations: 4 rolls of adding machine tape; 36 blank 5/8" cubes; 1,000 stickers for blank cubes; 200 1-cm cubes; 16 transparent blank spinners; 4 450-piece sets of power polygons; 4 buckets of square color tiles (400 per bucket); 1,000 Snap(TM) cubes; 1 set of elementary bar mass set-Ohaus; 4 graduated measuring prisms (2-cm x 5-cm x 21-cm); 4-liter measuring pitcher (calibrated 100 ml - 1,000 ml); 4 spectrum school balance (includes 7-piece mass set); 4 sets standard measuring pitchers (3 pitchers: quart, pint, cup per set); 10 measuring tapes; 12 meter/yard sticks.
- The total package for Grade 5 is listed at $1,388.42, and within that total the cost of the just mentioned student materials, for a class of 32, is $817.00 Many mathematics classrooms where active learning occurs already own many of these materials, so it is not necessary to purchase all of these items from the publisher.
- In the original edition, there was no multiplication table presented. Instead, students were instructed to color-code multiples of numbers on a 100s chart and evaluate these charts to find common multiples and patterns.
- There is no formal presentation of decimal addition. Students are instructed to begin by using colored pencils on 10,000 grid chart. The addition of decimals is related to students' work with whole number addition, with attention paid to place values so that students understand the reasoning behind lining up decimal points.
- Students are not instructed to compute an average by "adding up the items, and dividing by the number of items" because it is judged to be too complex for students of some groups to justify. Instead, the teacher is given a chapter on different ways to compute the median. Students using this curriculum could easily perform the calculation. It is important, however, to develop the underlying reasoning along with the procedure, which is done further into the data module rather than at the beginning.
- Students who demonstrate knowledge of a standard method of calculation are encouraged to demonstrate at least one other method of calculation, in order to demonstrate a complete understanding of the operation and numbers involved. Students who are later taught 'standard' methods can be ready to compare and contrast methods, and be able to flexibly move among their options.
- Students are asked to compute the volume of a rectangular solid. They are do not immediately use and are not told the standard formula of length multiplied by width and height. This formula, which is the formula given on standardized tests such as the SAT, is developed as a connection to previous work with multiplication, area, and the associative property.

== Parody ==
The textbook series has been parodied by the on-line cartoon series "Weapons of Math Destruction", including one panel of a student declaring that he can't finish his homework because they have run out of glue, or writing three different ways to determine if 2 is even or odd, and explaining the answer.
