= Reform mathematics =

Approach to mathematics education

Reform mathematics is an approach to mathematics education, particularly in North America. It is based on principles explained in 1989 by the National Council of Teachers of Mathematics (NCTM). The NCTM document Curriculum and Evaluation Standards for School Mathematics (CESSM) set forth a vision for K–12 (ages 5–18) mathematics education in the United States and Canada. The CESSM recommendations were adopted by many local- and federal-level education agencies during the 1990s. In 2000, the NCTM revised its CESSM with the publication of Principles and Standards for School Mathematics (PSSM). Like those in the first publication, the updated recommendations became the basis for many states' mathematics standards, and the method in textbooks developed by many federally-funded projects. The CESSM de-emphasised manual arithmetic in favor of students developing their own conceptual thinking and problem solving. The PSSM presents a more balanced view, but still has the same emphases.

Mathematics instruction in this style has been labeled standards-based mathematics or reform mathematics.

== Principles and standards ==
Mathematics education reform built up momentum in the early 1980s, as educators reacted to the "new math" of the 1960s and 1970s. The work of Piaget and other developmental psychologists had shifted the focus of mathematics educators from mathematics content to how children best learn mathematics. The National Council of Teachers of Mathematics summarized the state of current research with the publication of Curriculum and Evaluation Standards in 1989 and Principles and Standards for School Mathematics in 2000, bringing definition to the reform movement in North America.

Reform mathematics curricula challenge students to make sense of new mathematical ideas through explorations and projects, often in real-world contexts. Reform texts emphasize written and verbal communication, working in cooperative groups, and making connections between concepts and between representations. One of principles of reform mathematics is social equity. In contrast, "traditional" textbooks emphasize procedural mathematics and provide step-by-step examples with skill-building exercises.

Traditional mathematics focuses on teaching algorithms that will lead to the correct answer of a particular problem. Because of this focus on application of algorithms, the student of traditional math must apply the specific method that is being taught. Reform mathematics de-emphasizes this algorithmic dependence. Instead of leading students to find the exact answers to specific problems, reform educators focus students on the overall process which leads to an answer. Students' occasional errors are deemed less important than their understanding of an overall thought process. Research has shown that children make fewer mistakes with calculations and remember algorithms longer when they understand the concepts underlying the methods they use. In general, children in reform classes perform at least as well as children in traditional classes on tests of calculation skill, and perform considerably better on tests of problem solving.

== Controversy ==
Principles and Standards for School Mathematics was championed by educators, administrators and some mathematicians as raising standards for all students; others criticized it for its prioritizing the understanding of processes over the learning of standard calculation procedures. Parents, educators and some mathematicians opposing reform mathematics complained about students becoming confused and frustrated, claiming that the style of instruction was inefficient and characterized by frequent false starts. Proponents of reform mathematics countered that research showed that correctly-applied reform math curricula taught students basic math skills at least as well as curricula used in traditional programs, and additionally that reform math curricula was a more effective tool for teaching students the underlying concepts. Communities that adopted reform curricula generally saw their students' math scores increase. However, one study found that first-grade students with a below-average aptitude in math responded better to teacher-directed instruction.

During the 1990s, the large-scale adoption of curricula such as Mathland was criticized for partially or entirely abandoning teaching of standard arithmetic methods such as practicing regrouping or finding common denominators. Protests from groups such as Mathematically Correct led to many districts and states abandoning such textbooks. Some states—such as California—revised their mathematics standards to partially or largely repudiate the basic tenets of reform mathematics, and to re-emphasize mastery of standard mathematics facts and methods.

The American Institutes for Research (AIR) reported in 2005 that the NCTM proposals "risk exposing students to unrealistically advanced mathematics content in the early grades." This is in reference to NCTM's recommendation that algebraic concepts, such as understanding patterns and properties like commutativity (2+3=3+2), should be taught as early as first grade.

The 2008 National Mathematics Advisory Panel called for a balance between reform and traditional mathematics teaching styles, rather than a for a "war" to be waged between the proponents of the two styles. In 2006 NCTM published its Curriculum Focal Points, which made clear that standard algorithms, as well as activities aiming at conceptual understanding, were to be included in all elementary school curricula.

A common misconception was that reform educators did not want children to learn the standard methods of arithmetic. As the NCTM Focal Points made clear, such methods were still the ultimate goal, but reformers believed that conceptual understanding should come first. Reform educators believed that such understanding is best pursued by first allowing children to attempt to solve problems using their own understanding and methods. Eventually, under guidance from the teacher, students arrive at an understanding of standard methods. Even the controversial NCTM Standards of 1989 did not call for abandoning standard algorithms, but instead recommended a decreased emphasis on complex paper-and-pencil computation drills, and an increased emphasis on mental computation, estimation skills, thinking strategies for mastering basic facts, and conceptual understanding of arithmetic operations.

During the peak of the controversy in the 1990s, unfavorable terminology for reform mathematics appeared in press and web articles, including Where's the math?, anti-math, math for dummies, rainforest algebra, math for women and minorities, and new new math. Most of these critical terms refer to the 1989 Standards rather than the PSSM.

Beginning in 2011, most states adopted the Common Core Standards, which attempted to incorporate reform ideas, rigor (introducing ideas at a younger age), and a leaner math curriculum.

== See also ==
- A Mathematician's Lament
- Computer-based mathematics education
- Education in the United States
- Jo Boaler
- Mathematically Correct, which opposes the NCTM standards
- Mathematics education in the United States
- National Council of Teachers of Mathematics
- Prof David Klein (California State University Northridge), who opposes the NCTM standards
