= National Council of Teachers of Mathematics =

Mathematics education organization

- Formation: 1920
- Headquarters: Reston, Virginia
- President: Latrenda Knighten
- Website: www.nctm.org

Founded in 1920, The National Council of Teachers of Mathematics (NCTM) is a professional organization for schoolteachers of mathematics in the United States. One of its goals is to improve the standards of mathematics in education. NCTM holds annual national and regional conferences for teachers and publishes five journals.

== Journals ==
NCTM publishes three official journals. All are available in print and online versions.

- Mathematics Teacher: Learning and Teaching PK-12. According to the NCTM, this journal "reflects the current practices of mathematics education, as well as maintaining a knowledge base of practice and policy in looking at the future of the field. Content is aimed at preschool to 12th grade with peer-reviewed and invited articles." Until 2018, this was three journals:
  - Teaching Children Mathematics (called The Arithmetic Teacher until 1994), which focused on teaching math in elementary school,
  - Mathematics Teaching in the Middle School, and
  - The Mathematics Teacher, which focused on teaching in grades 8–14 (college).
- Mathematics Teacher Educator, published jointly with the Association of Mathematics Teacher Educators, contributes to building a professional knowledge base for mathematics teacher educators that stems from, develops, and strengthens practitioner knowledge. The journal provides a means for practitioner knowledge related to the preparation and support of teachers of mathematics to be not only public, shared, and stored, but also verified and improved over time (Hiebert, Gallimore, and Stigler 2002).
- Journal for Research in Mathematics Education (JRME) (although NCTM does not conduct research in mathematics education). JRME is devoted to the interests of teachers of mathematics and mathematics education at all levels—preschool through adult. JRME is a forum for disciplined inquiry into the teaching and learning of mathematics. The editors encourage the submission of a variety of manuscripts: reports of research, including experiments, case studies, surveys, philosophical studies, and historical studies; articles about research, including literature reviews and theoretical analyses; brief reports of research; critiques of articles and books; and brief commentaries on issues pertaining to research.

== National Metric Week ==
National Metric Week was begun by NCTM to promote awareness and understanding of the metric system following the passage of the Metric Conversion Act of 1975. It was first held in 1976 during the week beginning on May 10th. It continued to occur in May, although not always including the day May 10th, until 1983, when it was moved to the week of October 10th. This was done because the original date was considered to be too near to the end of the school year.

== NCTM Standards ==
NCTM has published a series of math Standards outlining a vision for school mathematics in the USA and Canada. In 1989, NCTM developed the Curriculum and Evaluation Standards for School Mathematics, followed by the Professional Standards for Teaching Mathematics (1991) and the Assessment Standards for School Mathematics (1995). Education officials lauded these math standards, and the National Science Foundation funded several projects to develop curricula consistent with recommendations of the standards. The Department of Education cited several of these programs as "exemplary". However, implementation of the reform has run into strong criticism and opposition, including parental revolts and the creation of antireform organizations such as Mathematically Correct and HOLD. These organizations object especially to reform curricula that greatly decrease attention to the practice and memorization of basic skills and facts. Critics of the reform include a contingent of vocal mathematicians, and some other mathematicians have expressed at least some serious criticism of the reformers in the past.

In 2000, NCTM released the updated Principles and Standards for School Mathematics. Principles and Standards is widely considered to be a more balanced and less controversial vision of reform than its predecessor.

=== Post–World War II plan ===
In 1944, NCTM created a postwar plan to help World War II have a lasting effect on math education. Grades 1-6 were considered crucial years to build the foundations of math concepts with the main focus on algebra. In the war years, algebra had one understood purpose: to help the military and industries with the war effort. Math educators hoped to help their students see the need for algebra in the life of an everyday citizen. The report outlined three strategies that helped math educators emphasize the everyday usage of algebra. First, teachers focused on the meanings behind concepts. Before, teachers were expected to use either the Drill or the Meaning Theory. Now, teachers gave students purpose behind every concept while providing an ample number of problems. Second, teachers abandoned the informal technique of teaching. This technique was popular during the 1930s and continued during the war, and in essence depended on what the students wanted to learn, based on their interests and needs. Instead, math teachers approached the material in an organized manner. The thinking was that Math itself had a very distinct organization that could not be compromised simply because the student was uninterested in the matter. Third, teachers learned to adapt to the students by offering the proper practice students needed in order to be successful. After the sixth year, seventh and eighth grades were considered key in ensuring students learned concepts, and were increasingly standardized for all pupils. During these years, teachers verified all key concepts learned in the previous years were mastered, while preparing students for the sequential math courses offered in high school. The army credited poor performance of males during the war to the men forgetting math concepts; it was recommended that reinforcing past concepts learned would solve this problem. The report lists the organization of the topics that should be taught in these years. "(1) number and computation; (2) the geometry of everyday life; (3) graphic representation; (4) an introduction to the essentials of elementary algebra (formula and equation)." At the same time, these years were meant to help students gain critical thinking skills applicable to every aspect of life. In middle school, students should gain maturity in math, and confidence in past material. In ninth grade, NCTM expressed the need for a two track curriculum for students in large schools. Those who have a greater desire to study math would go on one track, studying algebra. Those who did not have a large interest in math would go another route, studying general mathematics, which eliminated the problem of students being held back. Finally, grades 10-12 built math maturity. In the tenth year, courses focused on geometry through algebraic uses. The eleventh year focused on a continuation of more advanced algebra topics. These topics were more advanced than those discussed in the ninth grade. However, if the student took an advanced algebra class during the ninth year, then he took two of the semester classes offered the twelfth year.

=== 1961 The Revolution in School Mathematics ===
NCTM participated in promoting the adoption of the New Mathematics also known at that time as Modern Mathematics. In 1960, NCTM with the financial support of the National Science Foundation, conducted eight Regional Orientation Conferences in Mathematics in various parts of the United States, pushing to "make a concerted effort toward rapid improvement of school mathematics". In 1961 it issued a report The Revolution in School Mathematics subtitled A Challenge for Administrators and Teachers.

Morris Kline, a Professor of Mathematics, asserted in his book Why Johnny Can't Add: The Failure of the New Math that The Revolution in School Mathematics described the New Math curricula as a necessary milestone for establishing new and improved mathematics programs, and "implied that administrators who failed to adopt the reforms were guilty of indifference or inactivity". Most school administrators "did not have the broad scientific background to evaluate the proposed innovations", so they faced the choice of either adopting one of the modern programs, or admit that they are not competent to judge the merits of any one. Ultimately, "many principals and superintendents urged the modern curricula on their teachers just to show parents and school boards that they were alert and active".

Kline criticised the Modern Mathematics approach to mathematics education and labelled the term "Modern Mathematics" as "pure propaganda". He noted that "traditional connotes antiquity, inadequacy, sterility, and is a term of censure. Modern connotes the up-to-date, relevant, and vital".

=== 1989 Curriculum and Evaluation Standards for School Mathematics ===
The controversial 1989 NCTM Standards called for more emphasis on conceptual understanding and problem solving informed by a constructivist understanding of how children learn. The increased emphasis on concepts required decreased emphasis on direct instruction of facts and algorithms. This decrease of traditional rote learning was sometimes understood by both critics and proponents of the standards to mean elimination of basic skills and precise answers, but NCTM has refuted this interpretation.

In reform mathematics, students are exposed to algebraic concepts such as patterns and the commutative property as early as first grade. Standard arithmetic methods are not taught until children have had an opportunity to explore and understand how mathematical principles work, usually by first inventing their own methods for solving problems and sometimes ending with children's guided discovery of traditional methods. The Standards called for a de-emphasis of complex calculation drills.

The standards set forth a democratic vision that for the first time set out to promote equity and mathematical power as a goal for all students, including women and underrepresented minorities. The use of calculators and manipulatives was encouraged and rote memorization were de-emphasized. The 1989 standards encouraged writing in order to learn expression of mathematical ideas. All students were expected to master enough mathematics to succeed in college, and rather than defining success by rank order, uniform, high standards were set for all students. Explicit goals of standards based education reform were to require all students to pass high standards of performance, to improve international competitiveness, eliminate the achievement gap and produce a productive labor force. Such beliefs were considered congruent with the democratic vision of outcome-based education and standards based education reform that all students will meet standards. The U.S. Department of Education named several standards-based curricula as "exemplary", though a group of academics responded in protest with an ad taken out in the Washington Post, noting selection was made largely on which curricula implemented the standards most extensively rather than on demonstrated improvements in test scores.

The standards soon became the basis for many new federally funded curricula such as the Core-Plus Mathematics Project and became the foundation of many local and state curriculum frameworks. Although the standards were the consensus of those teaching mathematics in the context of real life, they also became a lightning rod of criticism as "math wars" erupted in some communities that were opposed to some of the more radical changes to mathematics instruction such as Mathland's Fantasy Lunch. Some students complained that their new math courses placed them into remedial math in college, though later research found students from traditional curricula were going into remedial math in even greater numbers. (See Andover debate.)

In the United States, curricula are set at the state or local level. The California State Board of Education was one of the first to embrace the 1989 standards, and also among the first to move back towards traditional standards.

=== 2000 Principles and Standards for School Mathematics ===
The controversy surrounding the 1989 standards paved the way for revised standards which sought more clarity and balance. In 2000, NCTM used a consensus process involving mathematicians, teachers, and educational researchers to revise its standards with the release of the Principles and Standards for School Mathematics, which replaced all preceding publications. The new standards were organized around six principles (Equity, Curriculum, Teaching, Learning, Assessment, and Technology) and ten strands, which included five content areas (Number and Operations, Algebra, Geometry, Measurement, and Data Analysis and Probability) and five processes (Problem Solving, Reasoning and Proof, Communication, Connections, and Representation). Principles and Standards was not perceived to be as radical as the 1989 standards and did not engender significant criticism. The new standards have been widely used to inform textbook creation, state and local curricula, and current trends in teaching.

=== 2006 Curriculum Focal Points ===
In September 2006, NCTM released Curriculum Focal Points for Prekindergarten through Grade 8 Mathematics: A Quest for Coherence. In the Focal Points, NCTM identifies what it believes to be the most important mathematical topics for each grade level, including the related ideas, concepts, skills, and procedures that form the foundation for understanding and lasting learning. In the Focal Points, NCTM made it clear that the standard algorithms were to be included in arithmetic instruction.

Mathematics curricula in the United States are often described as "a mile wide and an inch deep" when compared with curricula from other countries. State content expectations per grade level range anywhere between 26 and 89 topics. At just three per grade (plus a few additional "connection" topics), the focal points offer more than headings for long lists, providing instead descriptions of the most significant mathematical concepts and skills at each grade level and identifying important connections to other topics. NCTM believes that organizing a curriculum around these described focal points, with a clear emphasis on the processes that Principles and Standards addresses in the Process Standards—communication, reasoning, representation, connections, and, particularly, problem solving—can provide students with a connected, coherent, ever expanding body of mathematical knowledge and ways of thinking.

The Focal Points were one of the documents used in creating the 2010 Common Core State Standards, which have been adopted by most states as the basis for new math curricula.

== See also ==
- American Mathematical Association of Two-Year Colleges
- Common Core State Standards Initiative
- Computer-based mathematics education
- Math wars
- Mathematical Association of America
- New Mathematics
