= Principles and Standards for School Mathematics =

Guidelines produced by the National Council of Teachers of Mathematics

Principles and Standards for School Mathematics (PSSM) are guidelines produced by the National Council of Teachers of Mathematics (NCTM) in 2000, setting forth recommendations for mathematics educators. They form a national vision for preschool through twelfth grade mathematics education in the US and Canada. It is the primary model for standards-based mathematics.

The NCTM employed a consensus process that involved classroom teachers, mathematicians, and educational researchers. A total of 48 individuals are listed in the document as having contributed, led by Joan Ferrini-Mundy and including Barbara Reys, Alan H. Schoenfeld and Douglas Clements. The resulting document sets forth a set of six principles (Equity, Curriculum, Teaching, Learning, Assessment, and Technology) that describe NCTM's recommended framework for mathematics programs, and ten general strands or standards that cut across the school mathematics curriculum. These strands are divided into mathematics content (Number and Operations, Algebra, Geometry, Measurement, and Data Analysis and Probability) and processes (Problem Solving, Reasoning and Proof, Communication, Connections, and Representation). Specific expectations for student learning are described for ranges of grades (preschool to 2, 3 to 5, 6 to 8, and 9 to 12).

== Origins ==
The Principles and Standards for School Mathematics was developed by the NCTM. The NCTM's stated intent was to improve mathematics education. The contents were based on surveys of existing curriculum materials, curricula and policies from many countries, educational research publications, and government agencies such as the U.S. National Science Foundation. The original draft was widely reviewed at the end of 1998 and revised in response to hundreds of suggestions from teachers.

The PSSM is intended to be "a single resource that can be used to improve mathematics curricula, teaching, and assessment." The latest update was published in 2000. The PSSM is available as a book, and in hypertext format on the NCTM web site.

The PSSM replaces three prior publications by NCTM:

- Curriculum and Evaluation Standards for School Mathematics (1989), which was the first such publication by an independent professional organization instead of a government agency and outlined what students should learn and how to measure their learning.
- Professional Standards for Teaching Mathematics (1991), which added information about best practices for teaching mathematics.
- Assessment Standards for School Mathematics (1995), which focused on the use of accurate assessment methods.

== Six principles ==
- Equity: The NCTM standards for equity, as outlined in the PSSM, encourage equal access to mathematics for all students, "especially students who are poor, not native speakers of English, disabled, female, or members of minority groups." The PSSM makes explicit the goal that all students should learn higher level mathematics, particularly underserved groups such as minorities and women. This principle encourages provision of extra help to students who are struggling and advocates high expectations and excellent teaching for all students.
- Curriculum: In the PSSM's curriculum section, the NCTM promotes a "coherent" curriculum, in which an orderly and logical progression increases students' understanding of mathematics and avoids wasting time with unnecessary repetition. They acknowledge that the relative importance of some specific topics changes over time. For example, a basic understanding of iteration is important to students who are learning computer programming, and is almost absent from 19th century textbooks. Similarly, older American math textbooks included lessons that are no longer considered important, such as rules for calculating the number of bushels of hay that could be stored in a bin of stated dimensions, because this skill was useful to farmers at that time. The NCTM proposes that mathematics taught in modern classrooms be the skills that are most important to the students' lives and careers.
- Teaching: In the PSSM, the NCTM promotes sound teaching methods, without prescribing a one-size-fits-all approach. The NCTM wants teachers to be able to use their professional judgment in choosing teaching techniques. They favor professional development opportunities in both mathematics (content) and in effective teaching techniques (methods).
- Learning: According to the PSSM, a combination of "factual knowledge, procedural facility, and conceptual understanding" is necessary for students to use mathematics. While they state that "learning the 'basics' is important", the NCTM does not consider the most simplistic forms of memorization by repetition to be sufficient achievement in mathematics. A good student not only understands how and when to use facts, procedures, and concepts, but he or she also wants to figure things out and perseveres in the face of challenge. The NCTM particularly deprecates attitudes in schools that suggest only certain students are capable of mastering math.
- Assessment
- Technology

== Standards ==
Ten general strands or standards of mathematics content and processes were defined that cut across the school mathematics curriculum. Specific expectations for student learning, derived from the philosophy of outcome-based education, are described for ranges of grades (preschool to 2, 3 to 5, 6 to 8, and 9 to 12). These standards were made an integral part of nearly all outcome-based education and later standards-based education reform programs that were widely adopted across the United States.

=== Content standards ===
- Number and Operations: These are the fundamental basis of all mathematics, and teaching this critical area is the first content standard. All students must be taught to "understand numbers, ways of representing numbers, relationships among numbers, and number systems; understand meanings of operations and how they relate to one another; [and] compute fluently and make reasonable estimates." The ability to perform mental calculations and to calculate answers on paper is "essential."
- Algebra: The PSSM names four skills related to algebra that should be taught to all students: to "understand patterns, relations, and functions; represent and analyze mathematical situations and structures using algebraic symbols; use mathematical models to represent and understand quantitative relationships; [and] analyze change in various contexts." Very simple algebra skills are often taught to young children. For example, a student might convert an addition equation such as 19 + 15 = ? into a simpler equation, 20 + 14 = ? for easy calculation. Formally, this is described in algebraic notation like this: (19 + 1) + (15 − 1) = x, but even a young student might use this technique without calling it algebra. The PSSM recommends that all students complete pre-algebra coursework by the end of eighth grade and take an algebra class during high school.
- Geometry: The overall goals for learning geometry are to "analyze characteristics and properties of two- and three-dimensional geometric shapes and develop mathematical arguments about geometric relationships; specify locations and describe spatial relationships using coordinate geometry and other representational systems; apply transformations and use symmetry to analyze mathematical situations; [and] use visualization, spatial reasoning, and geometric modeling to solve problems." Some geometry skills are used in many everyday tasks, such as reading a map, describing the shape of an object, arranging furniture so that it fits in a room, or determining the amount of fabric or construction materials needed for a project. Teaching should be appropriate to students' developmental level: Young students should be able to explain the difference between a rectangle and a square, while older students should be able to express more complex reasoning, including simple mathematical proofs. (See van Hiele model.) The PSSM promotes the appropriate use of physical objects, drawings, and computer software for teaching geometry.
- Measurement: Measurement skills have many practical applications, as well as providing opportunities for advancing mathematical understanding and for practicing other mathematical skills, especially number operations (e.g., addition or subtraction) and geometry. Students should "understand measurable attributes of objects and the units, systems, and processes of measurement; [and] apply appropriate techniques, tools, and formulas to determine measurements." Unlike more abstract skills, the practical importance of measurement is readily apparent to students and parents.
- Data analysis and probability: The PSSM says that all students should learn to "formulate questions that can be addressed with data and collect, organize, and display relevant data to answer them; select and use appropriate statistical methods to analyze data; develop and evaluate inferences and predictions that are based on data; [and] understand and apply basic concepts of probability." These skills allow students to make sense of critical information, such as medical statistics and the results of political surveys. These skills are increasingly important as statistical data are used selectively by manufacturers to promote products. While young students learn simple skills such as ways to represent the number of pets belonging to their classmates, or traditional skills such as calculating the arithmetic mean of several numbers, older students might learn concepts that were traditionally neglected, such as the difference between the occasionally dramatic relative risk reduction figures and the more concrete absolute risk reduction, or why political pollsters report the margin of error with their survey results.

=== Process standards ===
- Problem Solving
- Reasoning and Proof
- Communication
- Connections
- Representation

== Curriculum Focal Points ==
In 2006, NCTM issued a document called "Curriculum Focal Points" that presented the most critical mathematical topics for each grade in elementary and middle schools. American mathematics instruction tends to be diffuse and is criticized for including too many topics each year. In part, this publication is intended to assist teachers in identifying the most critical content for targeted attention. More such publications are planned.

NCTM stated that "Focal Points" was a step in the implementation of the Standards, not a reversal of its position on teaching students to learn foundational topics with conceptual understanding. Contrary to the expectation of many textbook publishers and educational progressives, the 2006 Curriculum Focal Points strongly emphasized the importance of basic arithmetic skills in lower and middle grades. Because of this, the "Curriculum Focal Points" was perceived by the media as an admission that the PSSM had originally recommended, or at least had been interpreted as recommending, reduced instruction in basic arithmetic facts.

The 2006 Curriculum Focal Points identifies three critical areas at each grade level for pre-kindergarten through Grade 8. Samples of the specific focal points for three grades are below. (Note that the Simple Examples below are not quotes from the Focal Points, but are based on the descriptions of activities found in the Focal Points.)

Focal points	Related content standard	Simple example
Pre-Kindergarten Focal Points (student age: 4 or 5 years old)
Developing an understanding of whole numbers	Number and Operations	How many blue pencils are on the table?
Identifying shapes and describing spatial relationships	Geometry	Can you find something that is round?
Identifying measurable attributes and comparing objects by using these attributes	Measurement	Which one is longer?
Fourth Grade Focal Points (student age: 9 or 10 years old)
Developing quick recall of multiplication facts and related division facts and fluency with whole number multiplication	Number and Operations, Algebra	An auditorium has 26 rows of 89 seats. How many seats are there?
Developing an understanding of decimals, including the connections between fractions and decimals	Number and Operations	Draw a picture of 0.2. What fraction is this?
Developing an understanding of area and determining the areas of two-dimensional shapes	Measurement	How could we find the area of this L-shaped room?
Eighth Grade Focal Points (student age: 13 or 14 years old)
Analyzing and representing linear functions and solving linear equations and systems of linear equations	Algebra	The equation y = 4x + 4 shows the cost y of washing x windows. How much more will it cost each time I add 2 more windows to the job?
Analyzing two- and three-dimensional space and figures by using distance and angle	Geometry, Measurement	Use the Pythagorean theorem to find the distance between the two points on the opposite corners of this rectangle.
Analyzing and summarizing data sets	Data Analysis, Number and Operations, Algebra	What is the median price in this list? Does the median change if I lower the most expensive price?

The Focal Points define not only the recommended curriculum emphases, but also the ways in which students should learn them, as in the PSSM. An example of a complete description of one focal point is the following for fourth grade:

Number and Operations and Algebra: Developing quick recall of multiplication facts and related division facts and fluency with whole number multiplication
Students use understandings of multiplication to develop quick recall of the basic multiplication facts and related division facts. They apply their understanding of models for multiplication (i.e., equal-sized groups, arrays, area models, equal intervals on the number line), place value, and properties of operations (in particular, the distributive property) as they develop, discuss, and use efficient, accurate, and generalizable methods to multiply multidigit whole numbers. They select appropriate methods and apply them accurately to estimate products or calculate them mentally, depending on the context and numbers involved. They develop fluency with efficient procedures, including the standard algorithm, for multiplying whole numbers, understand why the procedures work (on the basis of place value and properties of operations), and use them to solve problems.

== Controversy ==
Because most education agencies in the United States have adopted the NCTM recommendations to varying degrees, many textbook publishers promote their products as being compliant with the publishers' interpretations of the PSSM. However, the NCTM does not endorse, approve, or recommend any textbooks or other products and has never agreed that any textbook accurately represents their goals.

== See also ==
- Education in the United States
- Reform mathematics
