= Mathematics education in the United States =

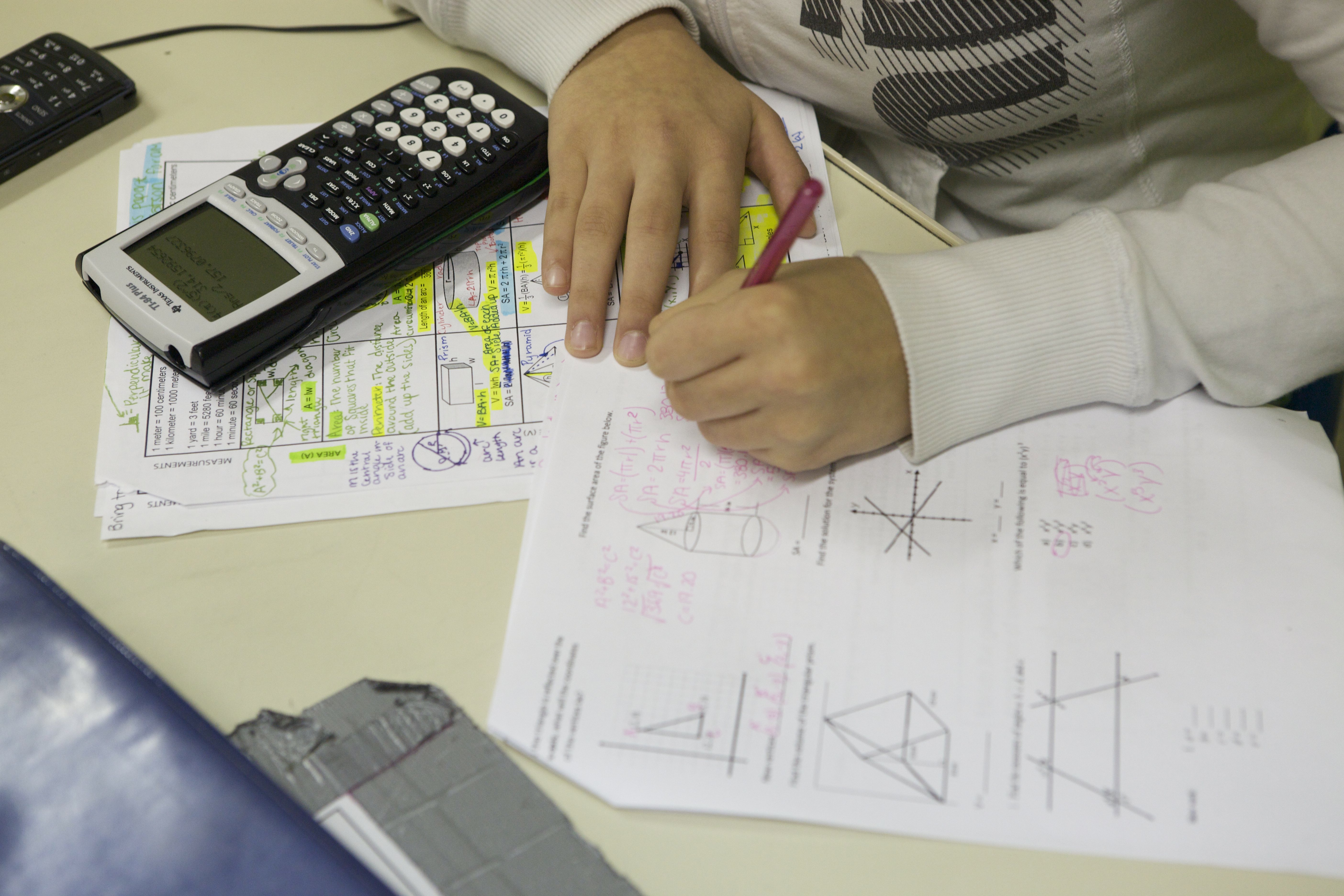
A student solves some math problems with a graphing calculator (2010)

Mathematics education in the United States varies considerably from one state to the next, and even within a single state. With the adoption of the Common Core Standards in most states and the District of Columbia beginning in 2010, mathematics content across the country has moved into closer agreement for each grade level. The SAT, a standardized university entrance exam, has been reformed to better reflect the contents of the Common Core.

Many students take alternatives to the traditional pathways, including accelerated tracks. As of 2023, twenty-seven states require students to pass three math courses before graduation from high school (grades 9 to 12, for students typically aged 14 to 18), while seventeen states and the District of Columbia require four. A typical sequence of secondary-school (grades 6 to 12) courses in mathematics reads: Pre-Algebra (7th or 8th grade), Algebra I, Geometry, Algebra II, Pre-calculus, and Calculus or Statistics. Some students enroll in integrated programs while many complete high school without taking Calculus or Statistics.

Counselors at competitive public or private high schools usually encourage talented and ambitious students to take Calculus regardless of future plans in order to increase their chances of getting admitted to a prestigious university and their parents enroll them in enrichment programs in mathematics.

Secondary-school algebra proves to be the turning point of difficulty many students struggle to surmount, and as such, many students are ill-prepared for collegiate programs in the sciences, technology, engineering, and mathematics (STEM), or future high-skilled careers. According to a 1997 report by the U.S. Department of Education, passing rigorous high-school mathematics courses predicts successful completion of university programs regardless of major or family income. Meanwhile, the number of eighth-graders enrolled in Algebra I has fallen between the early 2010s and early 2020s. Across the United States, there is a shortage of qualified mathematics instructors. Despite their best intentions, parents may transmit their mathematical anxiety to their children, who may also have school teachers who fear mathematics, and they overestimate their children's mathematical proficiency. As of 2013, about one in five American adults were functionally innumerate. By 2025, the number of American adults unable to "use mathematical reasoning when reviewing and evaluating the validity of statements" stood at 35%.

While an overwhelming majority agree that mathematics is important, many, especially the young, are not confident of their own mathematical ability. On the other hand, high-performing schools may offer their students accelerated tracks (including the possibility of taking collegiate courses after Calculus) and nourish them for mathematics competitions. At the tertiary level, student interest in STEM has grown considerably. However, many students find themselves having to take remedial courses for high-school mathematics and many drop out of STEM programs due to deficient mathematical skills. Many schools have begun to reform their mathematics remedial policies, including placing students assessed as needing remediation directly into college-level courses. National longitudinal studies of college student transcripts indicate that mathematics courses have lower success rates than most other subjects.

Compared to other developed countries in the Organization for Economic Co-operation and Development (OECD), the average level of mathematical literacy of American students is mediocre. As in many other countries, math scores dropped during the COVID-19 pandemic. However, Asian- and European-American students are above the OECD average.

== Curricular content and standards ==
A map showing states in the U.S. which have either adopted, not adopted, partially adopted, or repealed the Common Core State Standards as of 2016: States that have adopted the Standards States that have partially adopted the Standards States that adopted but later repealed the Standards States that never adopted the Standards

Each U.S. state sets its own curricular standards, and details are usually set by each local school district. Although there are no federal standards, since 2015 most states have based their curricula on the Common Core State Standards in mathematics. The stated goal of the Common Core mathematics standards is to achieve greater focus and coherence in the curriculum. This is largely in response to the criticism that American mathematics curricula are "a mile wide and an inch deep." The National Council of Teachers of Mathematics published educational recommendations in mathematics education in 1989 and 2000 which have been highly influential, describing mathematical knowledge, skills and pedagogical emphases from kindergarten through high school. The 2006 NCTM Curriculum Focal Points have also been influential for its recommendations of the most important mathematical topics for each grade level through grade 8. However, some states have either abandoned, or never adopted, the Common Core standards, but instead instituted their own. (See Common Core implementation by state.) In fact, there has been considerable disagreement on the style and content of mathematics teaching, including the question of whether or not there should be any national standards at all.

In the United States, mathematics curriculum in elementary and middle school is integrated, while in high school it traditionally has been separated by topic, with each topic usually lasting for the whole school year. However, some districts have integrated curricula, or decided to try integrated curricula after Common Core was adopted. Since the days of the Sputnik in the 1950s, the sequence of mathematics courses in secondary school has not changed: Pre-algebra, Algebra I, Geometry, Algebra II, Pre-calculus (or Trigonometry), and Calculus. Trigonometry is usually integrated into the other courses. Calculus is only taken by a select few. Some schools teach Algebra II before Geometry. Success in middle-school mathematics courses is correlated with having an understanding of numbers by the start of first grade. This traditional sequence assumes that students will pursue STEM programs in college, though, in practice, only a minority are willing and able to take this option. Often a course in Statistics is also offered.

While a majority of schoolteachers base their lessons on a core curriculum, they do not necessarily follow them to the letter. Many also take advantage of additional resources not provided to them by their school districts.

=== Primary school ===
Multiplication seen as scaling on the number line

Primary schoolchildren learn counting, arithmetic and properties of operations, geometry, measurement, statistics and probability. They typically begin studying fractions in third grade. On average, teachers who have a stronger grasp of mathematics use mathematical vocabulary more frequently and have better students.

=== Secondary school ===
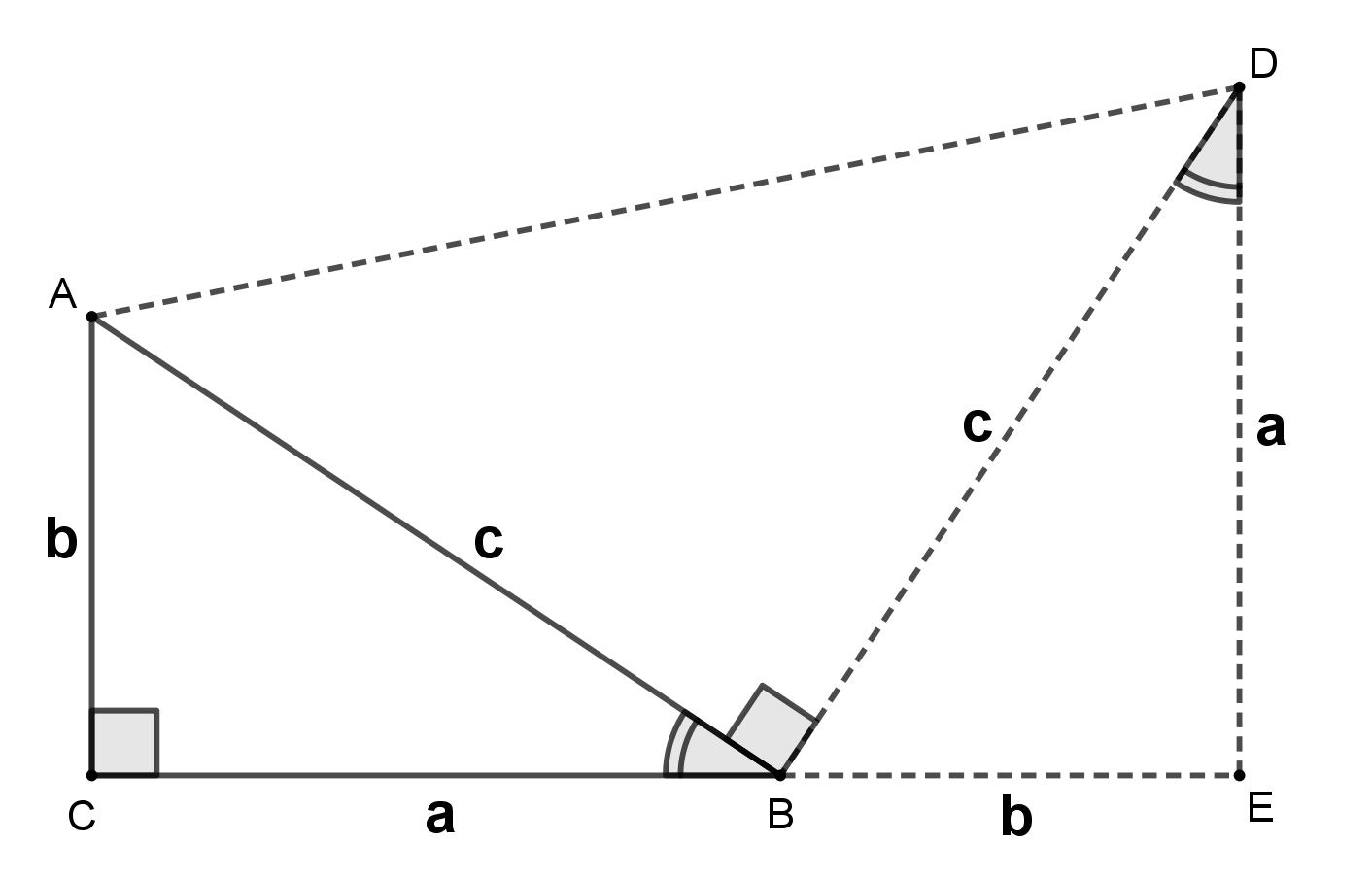
James A. Garfield's proof of the Pythagorean theorem.

Pre-algebra is typically taken in middle school by sixth, seventh or eighth graders (though in exceptional cases, it can be taken earlier). Students typically begin by learning about real numbers and basic number theory (prime numbers, prime factorization, fundamental theorem of arithmetic, ratios, and percentages), topics needed for algebra (powers, roots, graphing, order of operations, variables, expressions, and scientific notation) and geometry (quadrilaterals, polygons, areas of plane figures, the Pythagorean theorem, distance formula, equations of a line, simple solids, their surface areas, and volumes), and sometimes introductory trigonometry (definitions of the trigonometric functions). Such courses usually then go into simple algebra with solutions of simple linear equations and inequalities.

Many middle schoolchildren struggle with fractions and decimals.

Algebra I is the first course students take in algebra. Although some students take it as seventh or eighth graders (and in some cases, even earlier), this class is most commonly taken in ninth grade after the students have taken Pre-algebra. Students learn about functions, linear equations and inequalities, systems of linear equations, graphs, polynomials, the factor theorem, radicals, and quadratic equations (factoring, completing the square, and the quadratic formula), and power functions.

Students who pass Algebra I in eighth grade are more likely to succeed in more advanced classes. It is a gatekeeper for those who want to pursue STEM because taking Algebra I in eighth grade allows students to eventually take Calculus before graduating from high school. As such, the percentage of students to take and pass Algebra I has been a major cause of concern. Tracking students by their aptitude and deciding when they should take Algebra I has become a topic of controversy in California and Massachusetts. Parents of high-performing students are among the most vocal critics of policies discouraging the taking of Algebra I in middle school. Some of them enroll their children in after-school or summer classes to help them stay on the accelerated tracks.

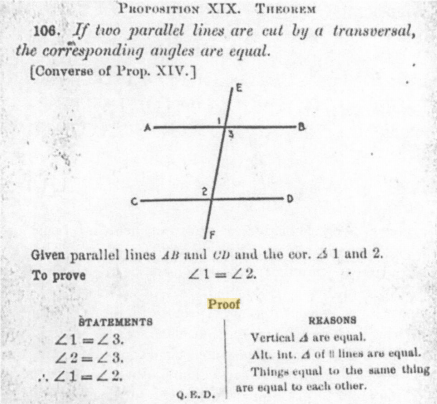
A two-column proof of the congruence of corresponding angles

Geometry, usually taken in ninth or tenth grade, introduces students to the notion of rigor in mathematics by way of some basic concepts in mainly Euclidean geometry. Students learn the rudiments of propositional logic, methods of proof (direct and by contradiction), parallel lines, triangles (congruence and similarity), circles (secants, tangents, chords, central angles, and inscribed angles), the Pythagorean theorem, elementary trigonometry (angles of elevation and depression, the law of sines), basic analytic geometry (equations of lines, point-slope and slope-intercept forms, perpendicular lines, and vectors), and geometric probability. Students are traditionally taught to demonstrate simple geometric theorems using two-column proofs, a method developed in the early 20th century in the U.S. specifically for this course, though other methods may also be used. Depending on the curriculum and instructor, students may receive orientation towards calculus, for instance with the introduction of the method of exhaustion and Cavalieri's principle.

Visual proof of the double-angle identity for the sine

Algebra II has Algebra I as a prerequisite and is traditionally a high-school-level course. Course contents typically include inequalities, function notation, quadratic equations, power functions, exponential functions, logarithms. In some cases, it may also include matrices (including matrix multiplication, $2 \times 2$ matrix determinants and the inverse of a $2 \times 2$ matrix), the radian measure, graphs of trigonometric functions, trigonometric identities (Pythagorean identities, the sum-and-difference, double-angle, and half-angle formulas, the laws of sines and cosines), and conic sections, among other topics.

Requiring Algebra II for high school graduation gained traction across the United States in the early 2010s. The Common Core mathematical standards recognize both the sequential as well as the integrated approach to teaching high-school mathematics, which resulted in increased adoption of integrated math programs for high school. Accordingly, the organizations providing post-secondary education updated their enrollment requirements. For example, the University of California (UC) system requires three years of "college-preparatory mathematics that include the topics covered in elementary and advanced algebra and two- and three-dimensional geometry" to be admitted. After the California Department of Education adopted the Common Core, the UC system clarified that "approved integrated math courses may be used to fulfill part or all" of this admission requirement. On the other hand, in a controversial decision, the Texas Board of Education voted to remove Algebra II as a required course for high school graduation.

In California, suggestions that Algebra II should be de-emphasized in favor of Data Science (a combination of algebra, statistics, and computer science) has faced severe criticism out of concerns that such a pathway would leave students ill-prepared for collegiate education. In 2023, the faculty of the University of California system voted to end an admissions policy that accepts Data Science in lieu of Algebra II.

Students interested in taking AP Computer Science A or AP Computer Science Principles must have taken at least one course on algebra in high school. AP Computer Science Principles is essentially a combination of elementary computer science and data science. AP Chemistry specifically requires Algebra II.

Pascal's arithmetic triangle appears in combinatorics as well as algebra via the binomial theorem.

Precalculus follows from the above, and is usually taken by college-bound students. Pre-calculus combines algebra, analytic geometry, and trigonometry. Topics in algebra include the binomial theorem, complex numbers, the Fundamental Theorem of Algebra, root extraction, polynomial long division, partial fraction decomposition, and matrix operations. In chapters on trigonometry, students learn about radian angle measure, are shown the sine and cosine functions as coordinates on the unit circle, relate the six common trigonometric functions and their inverses and plot their graphs, solve equations involving trigonometric functions, and practice manipulating trigonometric identities. In the chapters on analytic geometry, students are introduced to polar coordinates and deepen their knowledge of conic sections. Some courses include the basics of vector geometry, including the dot product and the projection of one vector onto another. If time and aptitude permit, students might learn Heron's formula or the vector cross product. Students are introduced to the use of a graphing calculator to help them visualize the plots of equations and to supplement the traditional techniques for finding the roots of a polynomial, such as the rational root theorem and the Descartes rule of signs. Precalculus ends with an introduction to limits of a function. Some instructors might give lectures on mathematical induction and combinatorics in this course. Precalculus is a prerequisite for AP Physics 1 and AP Physics 2 (formerly AP Physics B).

AP Precalculus has only three required chapters. polynomial and rational functions, exponential and logarithmic functions, and trigonometric functions and polar curves. Optional materials include parametric equations, implicit functions, conic sections, vectors, and matrix algebra ($2 \times 2$ matrix inversion, $2 \times 2$ determinants, and linear transformations). According to the College Board, "AP Precalculus may be the last mathematics course of a student's secondary education, the course is structured to provide a coherent capstone experience and is not exclusively focused on preparation for future courses."

Depending on the school district, several courses may be compacted and combined within one school year, either studied sequentially or simultaneously. For example, in California, Algebra II and Precalculus may be taken as a single compressed course. Without such acceleration, it may be not possible to take more advanced classes like Calculus in high school.

In Oregon, high-school juniors and seniors may choose between three separate tracks, depending on their interests. Those aiming for a career in mathematics, the physical sciences, and engineering can pursue the traditional pathway, taking Algebra II and Precalculus. Those who want to pursue a career in the life sciences, the social sciences, or business can take Statistics and Mathematical Modelling. Students bound for technical training can take Applied Mathematics and Mathematical Modelling. In Florida, students may also receive lessons on mathematical logic and set theory at various grade levels in high school following the new 2020 reforms. The new Floridian standards also promote financial literacy and emphasize how different mathematical topics from different grade levels are connected. In Utah, the final required mathematics course in high school incorporates elements of Algebra II, Trigonometry, Precalculus, and Data Science. However, as of 2023, students may opt out of this class with a signed letter from their parents, and about half do.

College algebra is offered at many community colleges as remedial courses for students who did not pass courses before Calculus. It should not be confused with abstract algebra and linear algebra, taken by students who major in mathematics and allied fields (such as computer science) in four-year colleges and universities.

Illustration of the epsilon-delta definition of the limit of a function

Calculus is usually taken by high-school seniors or university freshmen, but can occasionally be taken as early as tenth grade. Unlike many other countries from France to Israel to Singapore, which require high school students aiming for a career in STEM or placed in the track for advanced mathematics to study calculus, the United States generally treats calculus as collegiate mathematics. A successfully completed college-level Calculus course like one offered via Advanced Placement program (AP Calculus AB and AP Calculus BC) is a transfer-level course—that is, it can be accepted by a college as a credit towards graduation requirements. Many schools consider success in Calculus to be a measure of readiness for higher education. Prestigious colleges and universities are believed to require successful completion AP courses, including AP Calculus, for admissions. Calculus is a prerequisite or a corequisite for AP Physics C: Mechanics and AP Physics C: Electricity and Magnetism, but some high schools and colleges teach calculus in the same courses as introductory physics. Since the 1990s, the role of Calculus in the high school curriculum has been a topic of controversy.

In this class, students learn about limits and continuity (the intermediate and mean value theorems), differentiation (the product, quotient, and chain rules) and its applications (implicit differentiation, logarithmic differentiation, related rates, optimization, concavity, Newton's method, L'Hôpital's rules), integration and the Fundamental Theorem of Calculus, techniques of integration (u-substitution, by parts, trigonometric and hyperbolic substitution, and by partial fractions decomposition), further applications of integration (calculating accumulated change, various problems in the sciences and engineering, separable ordinary differential equations, arc length of a curve, areas between curves, volumes and surface areas of solids of revolutions), improper integrals, numerical integration (the midpoint rule, the trapezoidal rule, Simpson's rule), infinite sequences and series and their convergence (the nth-term, comparison, ratio, root, integral, p-series, and alternating series tests), Taylor's theorem (with the Lagrange remainder), Newton's generalized binomial theorem, Euler's complex identity, polar representation of complex numbers, parametric equations, and curves in polar coordinates.

Depending on the course and instructor, special topics in introductory calculus might include the classical differential geometry of curves (arc-length parametrization, curvature, torsion, and the Frenet–Serret formulas), the epsilon-delta definition of the limit, first-order linear ordinary differential equations, Bernoulli differential equations. Some American high schools today also offer multivariable calculus (partial differentiation, the multivariable chain rule and Clairault's theorem; constrained optimization, Lagrange multipliers and the Hessian; multidimensional integration, Fubini's theorem, change of variables, and Jacobian determinants; gradients, directional derivatives, divergences, curls, the fundamental theorem of gradients, Green's theorem, Stokes' theorem, and Gauss' theorem).

Other optional mathematics courses may be offered, such as statistics (including AP Statistics) or business math. Students learn to use graphical and numerical techniques to analyze distributions of data (including univariate, bivariate, and categorical data), the various methods of data collection and the sorts of conclusions one can draw therefrom, probability, and statistical inference (point estimation, confidence intervals, and significance tests). A second course on algebra is a prerequisite for AP Statistics.

High school students of exceptional ability may be selected to join a competition, such as the USA Mathematical Olympiad, or the International Mathematical Olympiad.

=== Tertiary school ===
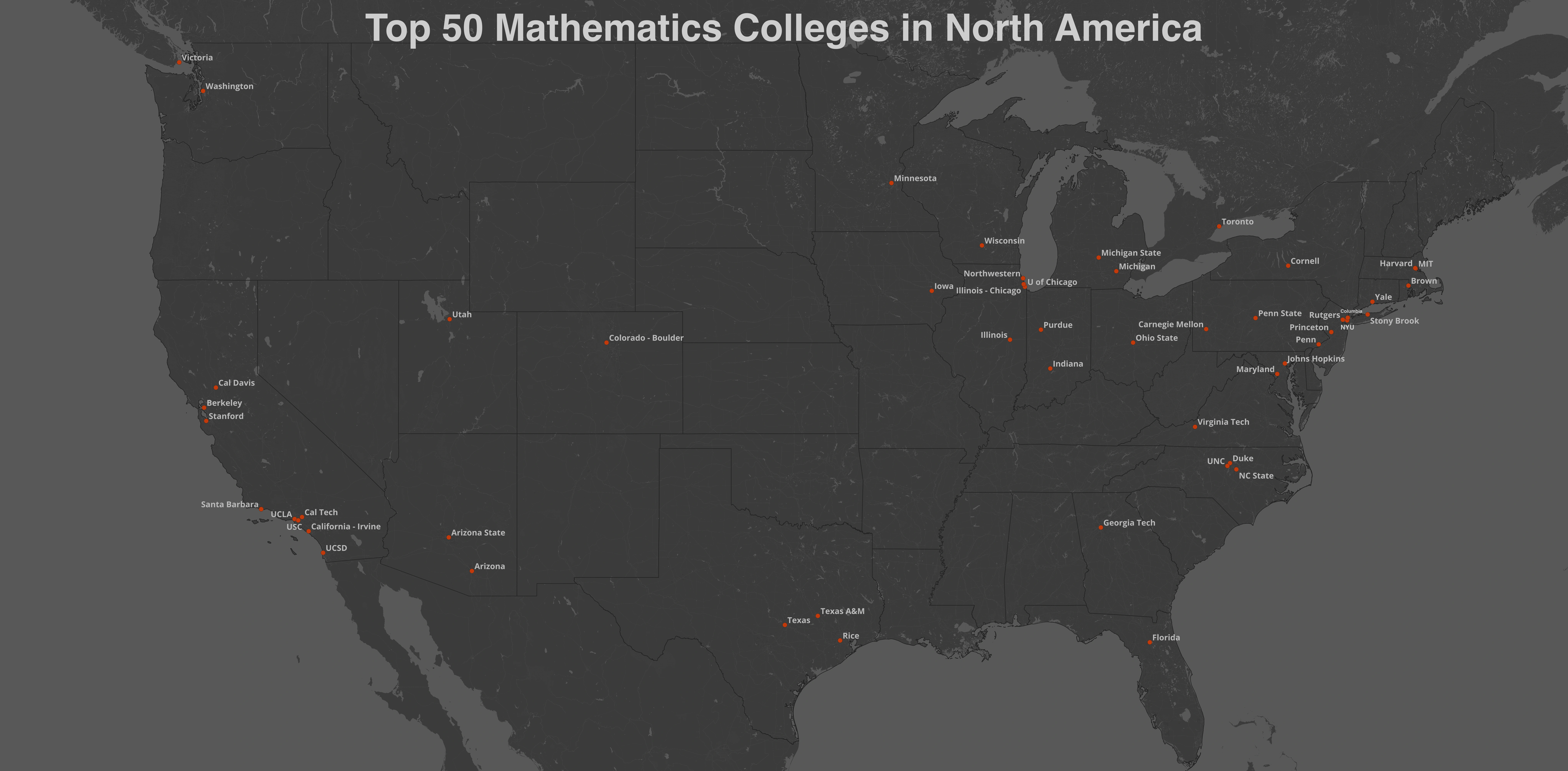
Top colleges and universities in North America for mathematics

Students majoring in mathematics, the physical sciences, engineering, and computer science must take single-variable calculus (unless they already have Advanced Placement credits, or equivalent, such as IB Math HL), multivariable calculus, and linear algebra, among other courses. Exact requirements and available courses will depend on the institution in question.

At many colleges and universities, confident students may compete in the Integration Bee. Exceptional undergraduates may participate in the annual William Lowell Putnam Mathematical Competition. Many successful competitors have gone on to fruitful research careers in mathematics. Although doing well on the Putnam is not a requirement for becoming a mathematician, it encourages students to develop skills and hone intuitions that could help them become successful researchers. Besides the monetary prize, the winners are virtually guaranteed acceptance to a prestigious graduate school. Such competitions are one way for mathematical talents to stand out.

== Attendance and completion rates ==
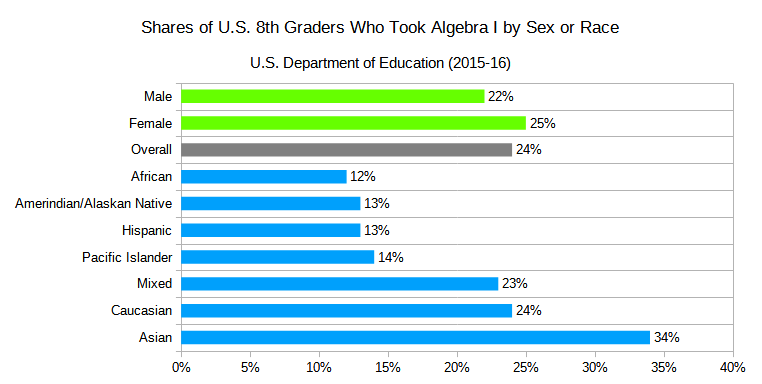
Significant race or sex differences exist in the completion of Algebra I.

For many students, passing algebra is often a Herculean challenge, so much so that many students have dropped out of high school because of it. The greatest obstacle for excelling in algebra is fluency with fractions, something many Americans do not have. Without mastery of high-school algebra—Algebra I and II—students will not be able to pursue collegiate STEM courses. In fact, the lack of adequate preparation in mathematics is part of the reason why the rate of attrition in STEM is so high. From 1986 to 2012, though more students were completing Algebra II, their average performance has fallen. Indeed, students who had passed high-school courses, including those labeled "honors" courses, might still fail collegiate placement exams and had to take remedial courses. As for Algebra I, the number of 13-year-olds enrolled fell from 34% in 2012 to 24% in 2023.

Longitudinal analysis shows that the number of students completing high-school courses on calculus and statistics, including AP courses, have declined before 2019. Data taken from students' transcripts ($N = 15,188$) from the late 2000s to the mid-2010s reveals that majorities of students had completed Algebra I (96%), Geometry (76%), and Algebra II (62%). But not that many took Precalculus (34%), Trigonometry (16%), Calculus (19%), or Statistics (11%) and only an absolute minority took Integrated Mathematics (7%). Overall, female students were more likely to complete all mathematics courses, except Statistics and Calculus. Asian Americans were the most likely to take Precalculus (55%), Statistics (22%), and Calculus (47%) while African Americans were the least likely to complete Calculus (8%) but most likely to take Integrated Mathematics (10%) in high school. Among students identified as mathematically proficient by the PSAT, Asians are much more likely than blacks to attend an honors or Advanced Placement course in mathematics. Asians are also the most likely to have scored at least a 3 on the AP Calculus exams. Students of lower socioeconomic status were less likely to pass Precalculus, Calculus, and Statistics. While boys and girls are equally likely to take AP Statistics and AP Calculus AB, boys are the majority in AP Calculus BC (59%), as well as some other highly mathematical subjects, such as AP Computer Science A (80%), AP Physics C: Mechanics (74%) and AP Physics C: Electricity and Magnetism (77%). Although undergraduate men and women score the same grades in Calculus I (in college) on average, women are more likely than men to drop out because of mathematical anxiety. Perceptions and stereotypes of girls being less mathematically able than boys begin as early as second grade, and they affect how girls actually perform in class or in a competition, such as the International Mathematical Olympiad. Among university students who have taken calculus, engineering disciplines are the most popular among men and biology among women.

During the 1970s and 1980s, the number of students taking remedial courses in college rose substantially, partly due to the de-emphasis of calculus in high school, leading to less exposure to pre-calculus topics. In the twenty-first century, American community colleges require 60% of their students to pass at least one course in mathematics, depending on the program. But around 80% fail to meet this requirement, and 60% require remedial courses. Many students at these schools drop out after failing even in remedial courses, such as (the equivalent of) Algebra II. On the other hand, four-year institutions have seen increased student interest in STEM programs, including mathematics and statistics.

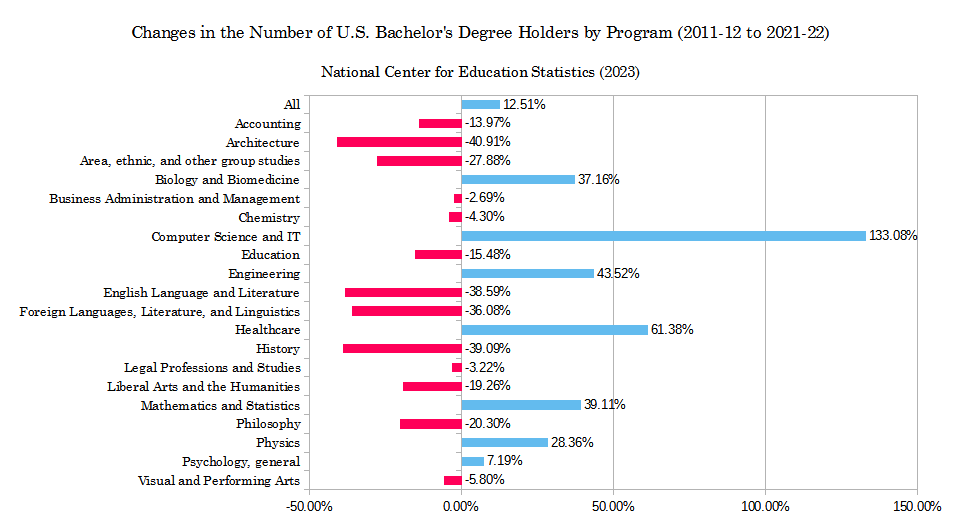
Healthcare and most STEM subjects, including mathematics and statistics, have grown in popularity while the liberal arts and social studies, especially history, have declined due to market forces.

== Controversies and issues ==
Mathematics education has been a topic of debate among academics, parents, as well as educators. Majorities agree that mathematics is crucial, but there has been many divergent opinions on what kind of mathematics should be taught and whether relevance to the "real world" or rigor should be emphasized. Another source of contention is the decentralized nature of American education, making it difficult to introduce standard curriculum implemented nationwide, despite the benefits of such a program as seen from the experience of other countries, such as Italy. In the early 2020s, the decision by some educators to include the topics of race and sexuality into the mathematical curriculum has also met with stiff resistance.

=== Progressive education ===
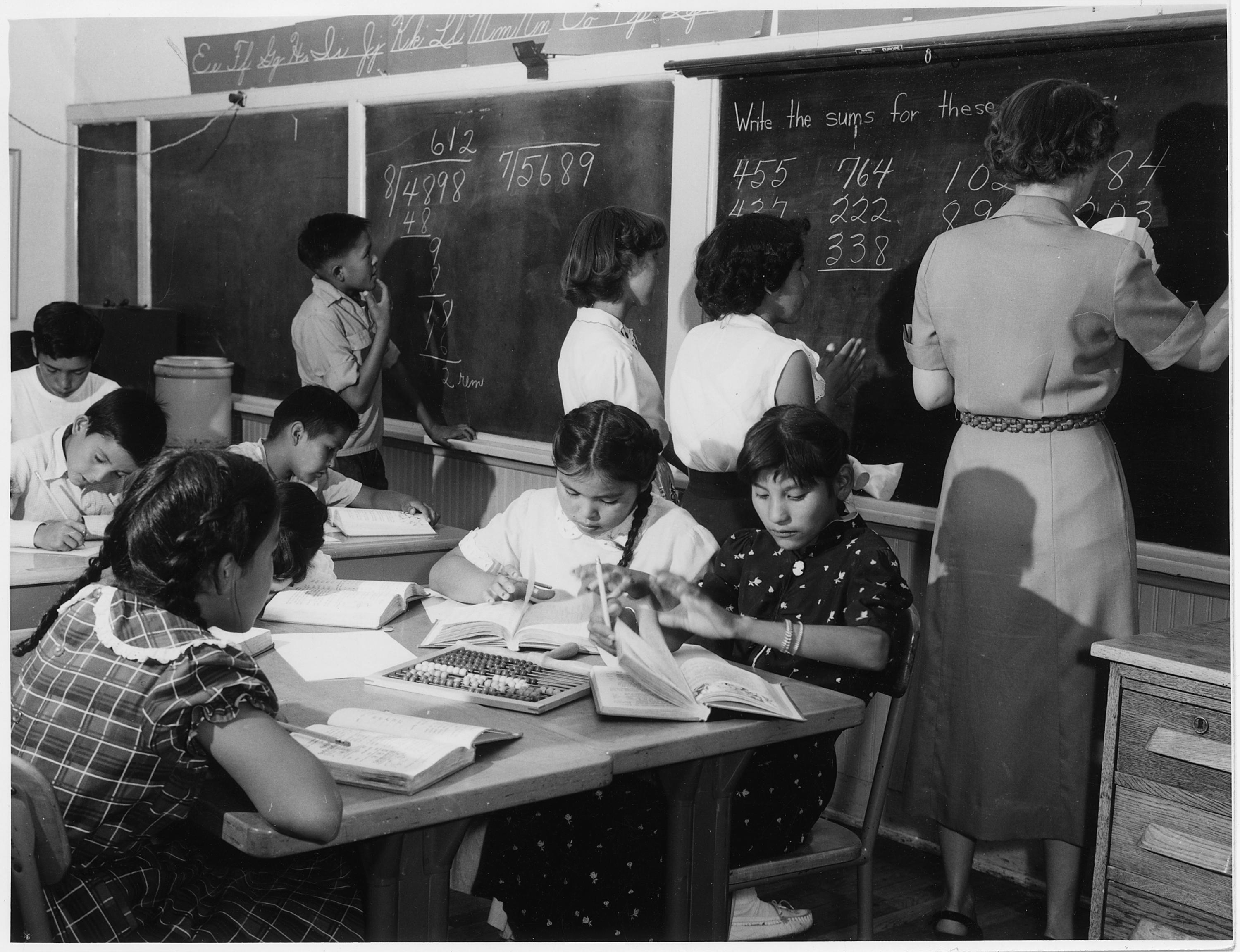
Navajo students learning arithmetic (c. 1940). By the late 1950s, mathematics education had become more rigorous.

During the first half of the twentieth century, there was a movement aimed at systematically reforming American public education along more "progressive" grounds. William Heard Kilpatrick, one of the most vocal proponents of progressive education, advocated for the de-emphasis of intellectual "luxuries" such as algebra, geometry, and trigonometry, calling them "harmful rather than helpful to the kind of thinking necessary for ordinary living." He recommended that more advanced topics in mathematics should only be taught to the select few. Indeed, prior to the Second World War, it was common for educationists to argue against the teaching of academic subjects and in favor of more utilitarian concerns of "home, shop, store, citizenship, and health," presuming that a majority of high school students could not embark on a path towards higher education but were instead, destined to become unskilled laborers or their wives.

By the 1940s, however, the deficiency in mathematical skills among military recruits became a public scandal. Admiral Chester Nimitz himself complained about the lack of skills that should have been taught in public schools among officers in training and volunteers. In order to address this issue, the military had to open courses to teach basic skills such as arithmetic for bookkeeping or gunnery.

Indeed, many parents opposed the progressive reforms, criticizing the lack of contents. By mid-century, technological marvels, such as radar, nuclear energy, and the jet engine, made progressive education untenable.

=== New Math ===
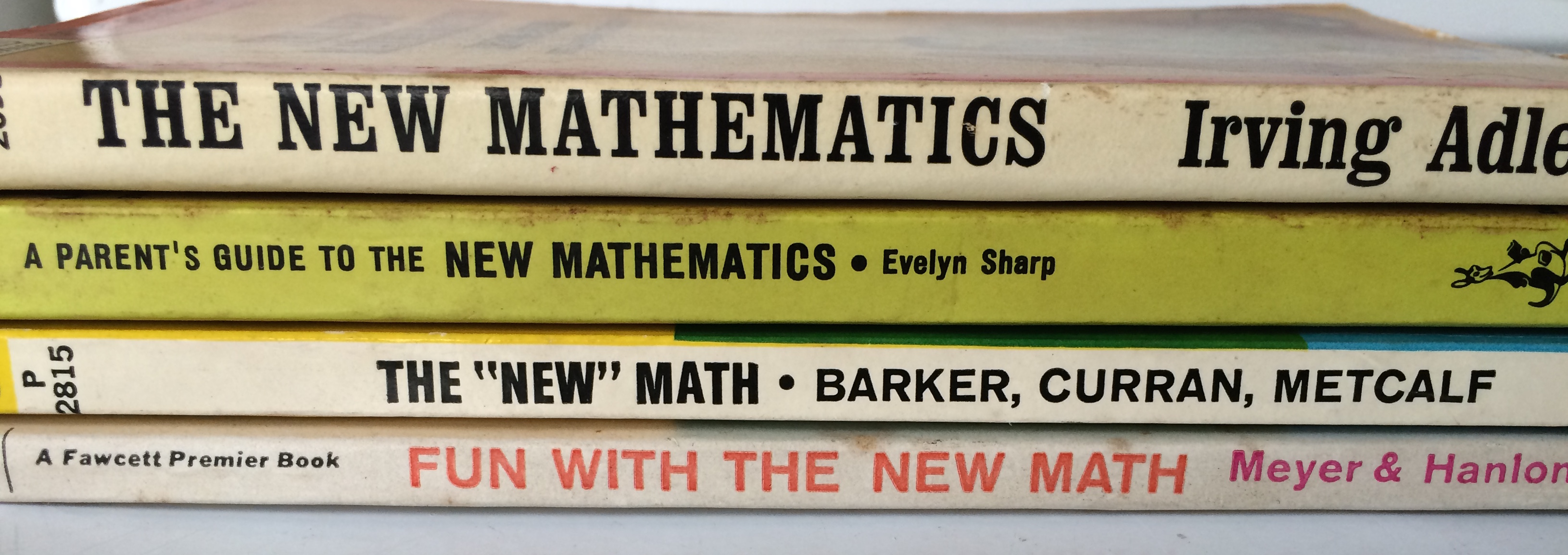
Some textbooks for the "New Math" curriculum from the 1960s. These reforms were controversial in the United States and elsewhere.

Under the New Math initiative, created after the successful launch of the Soviet satellite Sputnik in 1957, conceptual abstraction rather than calculation gained a central role in mathematics education. The educational status quo was severely criticized as a source of national humiliation and reforms were demanded, prompting Congress to introduce the National Defense Education Act of 1958. The U.S. federal government under President Dwight D. Eisenhower realized it needed thousands of scientists and engineers to match the might of its ideological rival the Soviet Union and started pouring enormous sums of money into research and development as well as education. Conceived in response to the lack of emphasis on content of the progressive education and the technological advances of World War II, New Math was part of an international movement influenced by the Nicholas Bourbaki school in France, attempting to bring the mathematics taught in schools closer to what research mathematicians actually use. Students received lessons in set theory, which is what mathematicians actually use to construct the set of real numbers, normally taught to advanced undergraduates in real analysis (see Dedekind cuts and Cauchy sequences). Arithmetic with bases other than ten was also taught (see binary arithmetic and modular arithmetic). Other topics included number theory, probability theory, and analytic geometry.

However, this educational initiative soon faced strong opposition, not just from teachers, who struggled to understand the new material, let alone teach it, but also from parents, who had problems helping their children with homework. It was criticized by experts, too. In a 1965 essay, physicist Richard Feynman argued, "first there must be freedom of thought; second, we do not want to teach just words; and third, subjects should not be introduced without explaining the purpose or reason, or without giving any way in which the material could be really used to discover something interesting. I don't think it is worthwhile teaching such material." In his 1973 book, Why Johnny Can't Add: the Failure of the New Math, mathematician and historian of mathematics Morris Kline observed that it was "practically impossible" to learn new mathematical creations without first understanding the old ones, and that "abstraction is not the first stage, but the last stage, in a mathematical development." Kline criticized the authors of the 'New Math' textbooks, not for their mathematical faculty, but rather their narrow approach to mathematics, and their limited understanding of pedagogy and educational psychology. Mathematician George F. Simmons wrote in the algebra section of his book Precalculus Mathematics in a Nutshell (1981) that the New Math produced students who had "heard of the commutative law, but did not know the multiplication table."

By the early 1970s, this movement was defeated. Nevertheless, some of the ideas it promoted still lived on. One of the key contributions of the New Math initiative was the teaching of calculus in high school.

=== Standards-based reforms and the NCTM ===
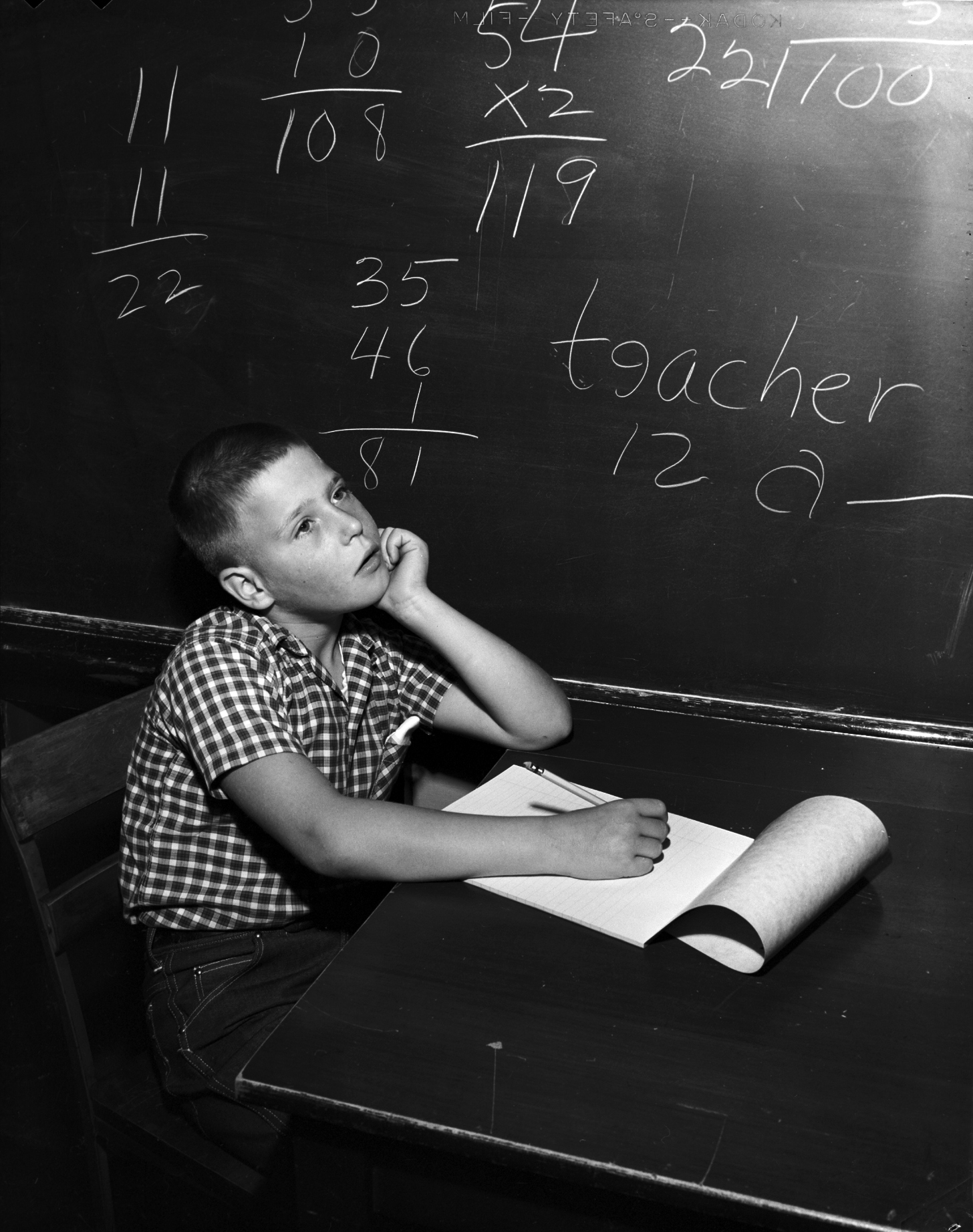
A schoolboy in Seattle (1961). The contents of mathematical education has been a topic of debate for decades.

From the late twentieth century to the early twenty-first, there has been a fierce debate over how mathematics should be taught. On one hand, some campaign for a more traditional teacher-led curriculum, featuring algorithms and some memorization. On the other hand, some prefer a conceptual approach, with a focus on problem-solving and the sense of numbers. However, some instructors and researchers have cast doubt on the utility of "classroom struggles" in helping students understand the concepts. Moreover, as mathematician Hung-Hsi Wu explained, the apparent dichotomy between basic skills and understanding of mathematical concepts is a delusion.

In 1989 the National Council for Teachers of Mathematics (NCTM) produced the Curriculum and Evaluation Standards for School Mathematics. Widespread adoption of the new standards notwithstanding, the pedagogical practice changed little in the United States during the 1990s. In fact, mathematics education became a hotly debated subject in the 1990s and early 2000s. This debate pitted mathematicians (like UC Berkeley mathematician Hung-Hsi Wu) and parents, many of whom with substantial knowledge of mathematics (such as the Institute for Advanced Study physicist Chiara R. Nappi), who opposed the NCTM's reforms against educational professionals, who wanted to emphasized what they called "conceptual understanding." In many cases, however, educational professionals did not understand mathematics as well as their critics. This became apparent with the publication of the book Knowing and Teaching Elementary Mathematics (1999) by Liping Ma. The author gave evidence that even though most Chinese teachers had only 11 or 12 years of formal education, they understood basic mathematics better than did their U.S. counterparts, many of whom were working on their master's degrees.

In 1989, the more radical NCTM reforms were eliminated. Instead, greater emphasis was put on substantive mathematics. In some large school districts, this came to mean requiring some algebra of all students by ninth grade, compared to the tradition of tracking only the college-bound and the most advanced junior high school students to take algebra. A challenge with implementing the Curriculum and Evaluation Standards was that no curricular materials at the time were designed to meet the intent of the Standards. In the 1990s, the National Science Foundation funded the development of curricula such as the Core-Plus Mathematics Project. In the late 1990s and early 2000s, the so-called math wars erupted in communities that were opposed to some of the more radical changes to mathematics instruction. Some students complained that their new math courses placed them into remedial math in college. However, data provided by the University of Michigan registrar at this same time indicate that in collegiate mathematics courses at the University of Michigan, graduates of Core-Plus did as well as or better than graduates of a traditional mathematics curriculum, and students taking traditional courses were also placed in remedial mathematics courses. Mathematics instructor Jaime Escalante dismissed the NCTM standards as something written by a PE teacher.

In 2001 and 2009, NCTM released the Principles and Standards for School Mathematics (PSSM) and the Curriculum Focal Points which expanded on the work of the previous standards documents. Particularly, the PSSM reiterated the 1989 standards, but in a more balanced way, while the Focal Points suggested three areas of emphasis for each grade level. Refuting reports and editorials that it was repudiating the earlier standards, the NCTM claimed that the Focal Points were largely re-emphasizing the need for instruction that builds skills and deepens student mathematical understanding. These documents repeated the criticism that American mathematics curricula are a "mile wide and an inch deep" in comparison to the mathematics of most other nations, a finding from the Second and Third International Mathematics and Science Studies.

=== Integrated mathematics ===
Some geometric curves expressed algebraically in polar coordinates

As previously stated, American children usually follow a unique sequence of mathematics courses in secondary school (grades 6 to 12), learning one subject at a time. They take two years of Algebra punctuated by a year of Geometry. Geometry, hitherto a collegiate course, was introduced into high schools in the nineteenth century. In Europe, schools followed Felix Klein's call for Geometry to be integrated with other math subjects. In 1892 the American Committee of Ten recommended the same strategy for the United States, but American teachers had already been developing the habit of teaching Geometry as a separate course. The American high-school geometry curriculum was eventually codified in 1912 and developed a distinctive American style of geometric demonstration for such courses, known as "two-column" proofs. This remains largely true today, with Geometry as a proof-based high-school math class. On the other hand, many countries around the world from Israel to Italy teach mathematics according to what Americans call an integrated curriculum, familiarizing students with various aspects of calculus and prerequisites throughout secondary school. In fact, many topics in Algebra and Geometry that Americans typically learn in high school are taught in middle school in Europe, making it possible for European countries to require and to teach calculus in high school. In France and Germany, calculus was brought into the secondary-school curriculum thanks to the advocacy of famous mathematicians, such as Henri Poincaré and Felix Klein, respectively. However, as the Singaporean case demonstrates, early exposure to the concepts of calculus does not necessarily translates to actual understanding among high school students. In the U.S., this is reflected in the concerns voiced by many university professors, according to whom their students lack sufficient preparation in pre-calculus mathematics. Proponents of teaching the integrated curriculum believe that students would better understand the connections between the different branches of mathematics. On the other hand, critics—including parents and teachers—prefer the traditional American approach both because of their familiarity with it and because of their concern that certain key topics might be omitted, leaving the student ill-prepared for college. As mentioned above, only 7% of American high school students take Integrated Mathematics.

=== Preparation for college ===
Beginning in 2011, most states have adopted the Common Core Standards for mathematics, which were partially based on NCTM's previous work. Controversy still continues as critics point out that Common Core standards do not fully prepare students for college and as some parents continue to complain that they do not understand the mathematics their children are learning. Indeed, even though they may have expressed an interest in pursuing science, technology, engineering, and mathematics (STEM) in high school, many university students find themselves ill-equipped for rigorous STEM education in part because of their inadequate preparation in mathematics. Meanwhile, Chinese, Indian, and Singaporean students are exposed to high-level mathematics and science at a young age. About half of STEM students in the U.S. dropped out of their programs between 2003 and 2009. On top of that, many mathematics schoolteachers were not as well-versed in their subjects as they should be, and might well be uncomfortable with mathematics themselves. An emphasis on speed and rote memorization gives as many as one-third of students aged five and over mathematical anxiety.

Parents and high school counselors consider it crucial that students pass Calculus if they aim to be admitted to a competitive university. Private school counselors are especially likely to make this recommendation while admissions officers are generally less inclined to consider it a requirement. Moreover, there has been a movement to de-emphasize the traditional pathway with Calculus as the final mathematics class in high school in favor of Statistics and Data Science for those not planning to major in a STEM subject in college. Nevertheless, Calculus remains the most recommended course for ambitious students. But in the case of Utah, as of 2023, students may skip the final required course for high-school graduation—one that combines elements of Algebra II, Trigonometry, Precalculus, and Statistics—if they submit a letter signed by their parents acknowledging that this decision could jeopardize their chances of university matriculation.

By the mid-2010s, only a quarter of American high school seniors are able to do grade-level math, yet about half graduate from high school as A students, prompting concerns of grade inflation. Strong performance in Algebra I, Geometry, and Algebra II predict good grades in university-level Calculus even better than taking Calculus in high school.

Another issue with mathematics education has been integration with science education. This is difficult for public schools to do because science and math are taught independently. The value of the integration is that science can provide authentic contexts for the math concepts being taught and further, if mathematics is taught in synchrony with science, then the students benefit from this correlation.

=== Enrichment programs and accelerated tracks ===
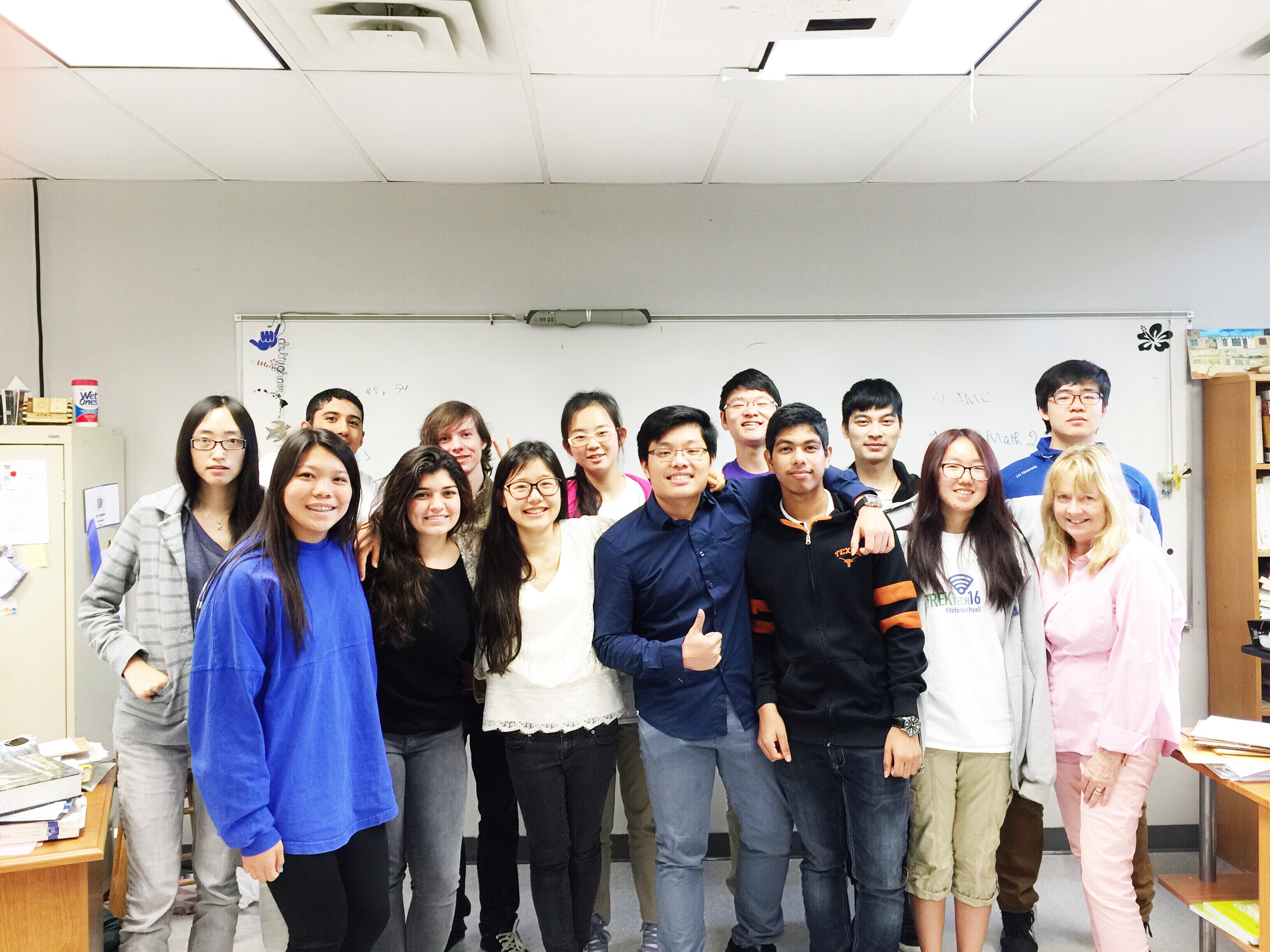
A math club at a preparatory school in Texas (2018)

Growing numbers of parents have opted to send their children to enrichment and accelerated learning after-school or summer programs in mathematics, leading to friction with school officials who are concerned that their primary beneficiaries are affluent white and Asian families, prompting parents to pick private institutions or math circles. Some public schools serving low-income neighborhoods even denied the existence of mathematically gifted students. In fact, American educators tend to focus on poorly performing students rather than those at the top, unlike their Asian counterparts. Parents' proposal for an accelerated track for their children are oftentimes met with hostility by school administrators. Conversely, initiatives aimed at de-emphasizing certain core subjects, such as Algebra I, triggered strong backlash from parents and university faculty members. Students identified by the Study of Mathematically Precocious Youth as top scorers on the mathematics (and later, verbal) sections of the SAT often became highly successful in their fields. By the mid-2010s, some public schools have begun offering enrichment programs to their students.

Similarly, while some school districts have proposed to stop separating students by mathematical ability in order to ensure they begin high school at the same level, parents of gifted children have pushed back against this initiative, fearing that it would jeopardize their children's future college admissions prospects, especially in the STEM fields. In San Francisco, for example, such a plan was dropped due to a combination of mixed results and public backlash.

=== Shortage of instructors ===
A shortage of qualified mathematics schoolteachers has been a serious problem in the United States for many years. In order to rectify this problem, the amount of instructional hours dedicated towards mathematical contents has been increased in undergraduate programs aimed at training elementary teachers. Teachers oftentimes unknowingly transmit their own negative attitude towards mathematics to their students, damaging the quality of instruction.

== Standardized tests ==
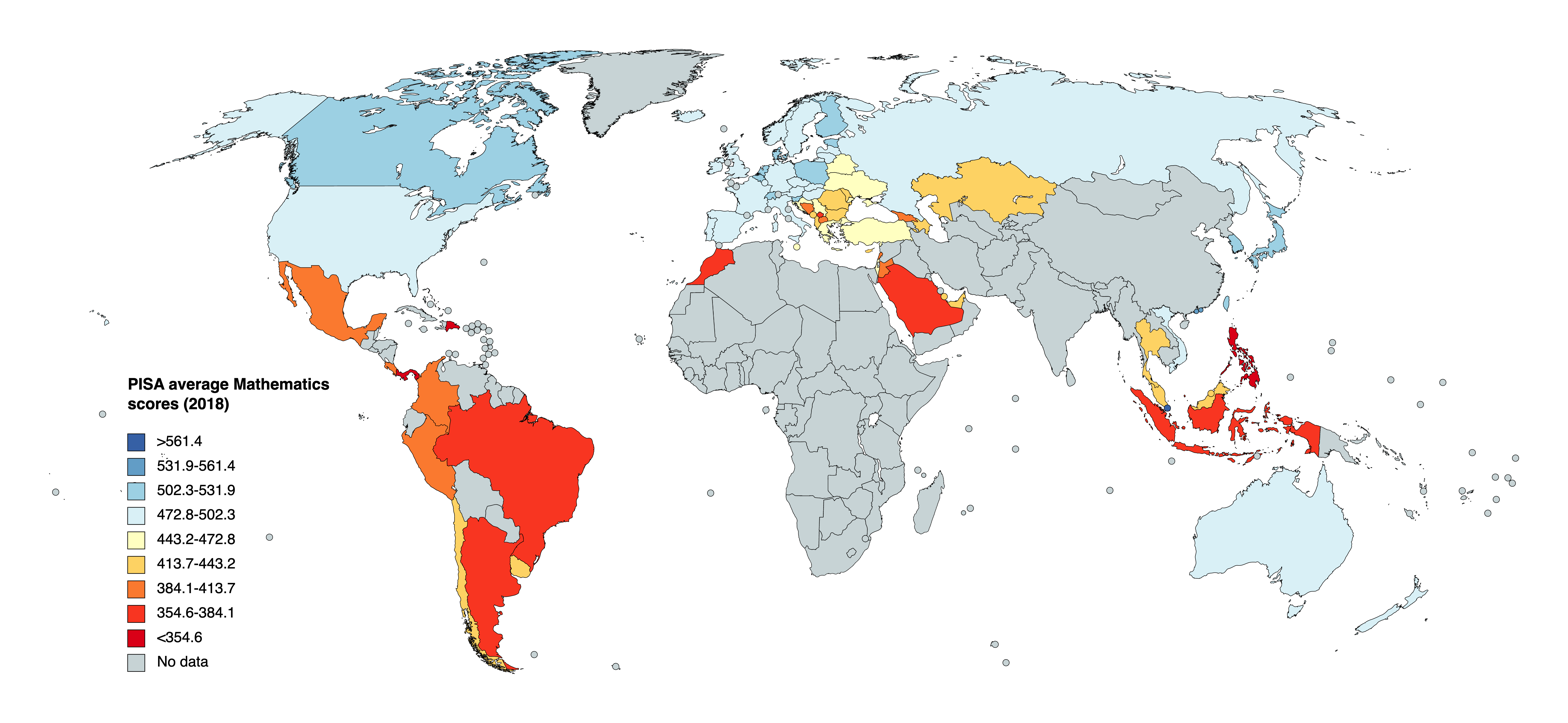
PISA average mathematics scores (2018)

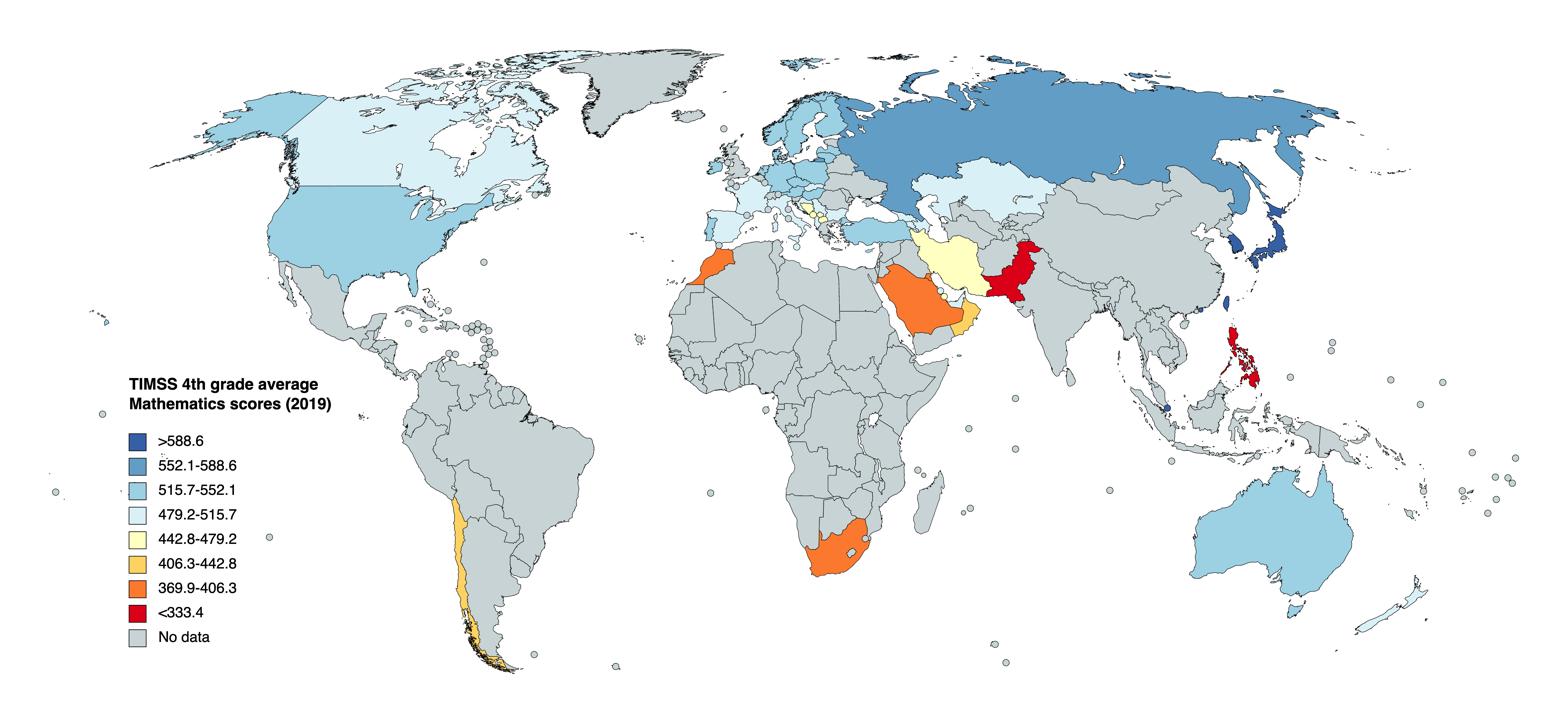
TIMSS 4th grade average mathematics scores (2019)

In 2002, President George W. Bush signed into law the No Child Left Behind Act, holding schools accountable for how their students performed on exams. It was repealed in 2015 with the passage of the Every Student Succeeds Act, transferring power back to the states, resulting in more relaxed standards.

The Program for International Student Assessment (PISA) is held every three years for 15-year-old students worldwide. In 2012, the United States earned average scores in science and reading. It performed better than other progressive nations in mathematics, ranking 36 out of 65 other countries. The PISA assessment examined the students' understanding of mathematics as well as their approach to this subject and their responses. These indicated three approaches to learning. Some of the students depended mainly on memorization. Others were more reflective on newer concepts. Another group concentrated more on principles that they have not yet studied. The U.S. had a high proportion of memorizers compared to other developed countries. During the 2015 testing, the United States failed to make it to the top 10 in all categories including mathematics. More than 540,000 teens from 72 countries took the exam. American students' average score in mathematics declined by 11 points compared to the previous testing. The 2022 PISA test showed that U.S. national average in mathematics remained behind those of other industrialized nations and remained below the OECD average. Furthermore, one third of American students did not meet the requirements for basic proficiency in mathematics.

However, European- and especially Asian-American students perform above the OECD average. See chart below.

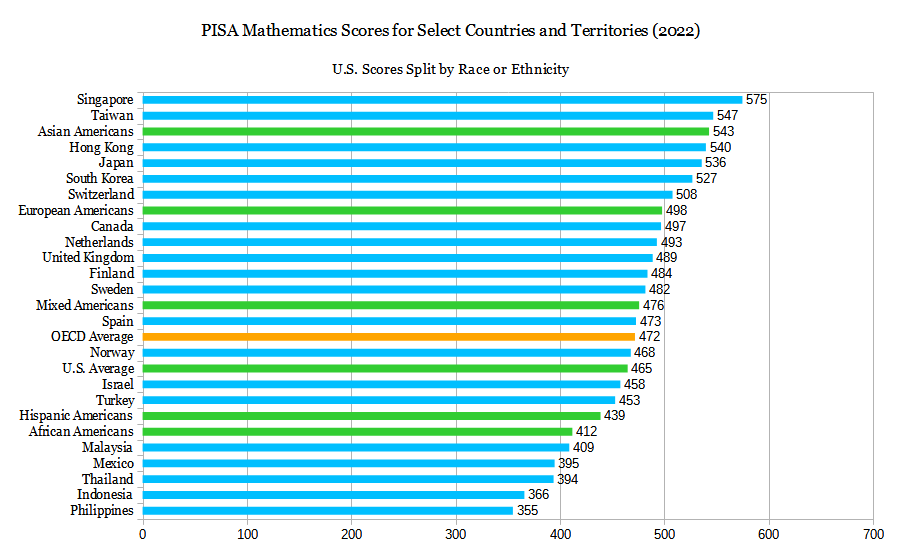

According to a 2021 report by the National Science Foundation (NSF), American students' mathematical literacy ranks 25th out of 37 nations of the Organization for Economic Cooperation and Development (OECD).

During the 2000s and 2010s, as more and more college-bound students take the SAT, scores have gone down. (See chart below.) This is in part because some states have required all high school students to take the SAT, regardless of whether or not they were going to college.

Historical average SAT math scores reached a nadir in 1980, declined between 2005 and 2016 and after the 2016 re-scaling.

In 2015, educational psychologist Jonathan Wai of Duke University analyzed average test scores from the Army General Classification Test in 1946 (10,000 students), the Selective Service College Qualification Test in 1952 (38,420), Project Talent in the early 1970s (400,000), the Graduate Record Examination between 2002 and 2005 (over 1.2 million), and the SAT Math and Verbal in 2014 (1.6 million). Wai identified one consistent pattern: those with the highest test scores tended to pick mathematics and statistics, the natural and social sciences, and engineering as their majors while those with the lowest were more likely to choose healthcare, education, and agriculture. (See the two charts below.)

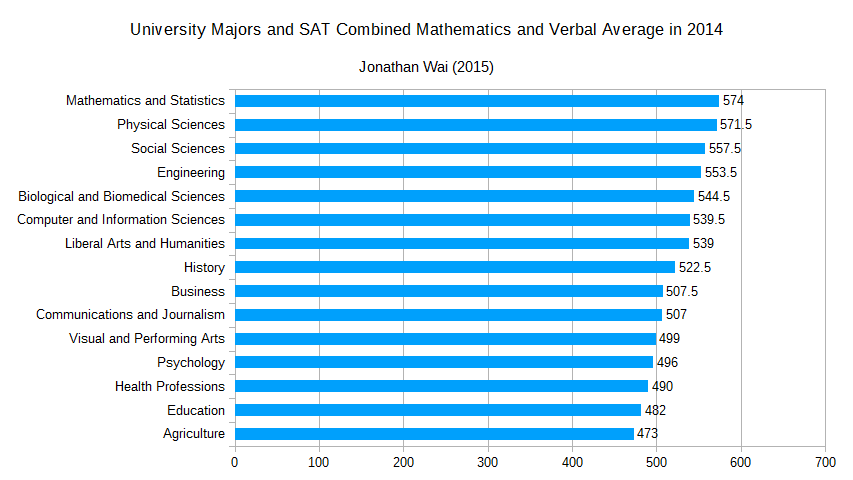

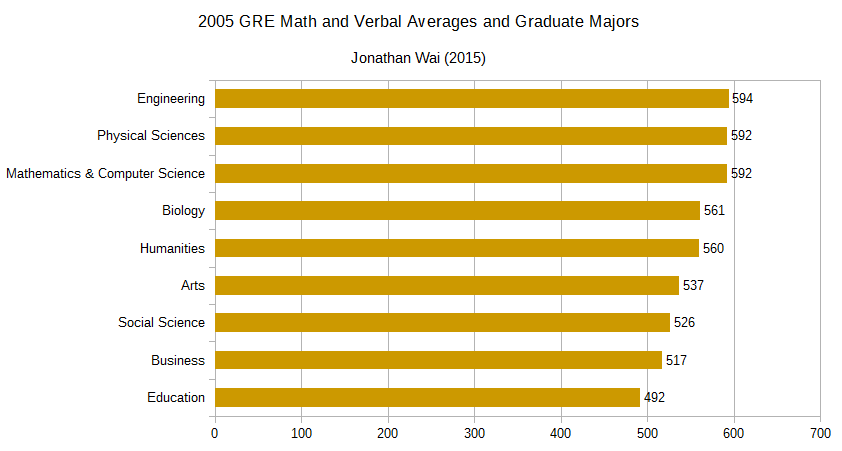

Results from the National Assessment of Educational Progress (NAEP) test show that scores in mathematics have been leveling off in the 2010s, but with a growing gap between the top and bottom students. The COVID-19 pandemic, which forced schools to shut down and lessons to be given online, further widened the divide, as the best students lost fewer points compared to the worst and therefore could catch up more quickly. While students' scores fell for all subjects, mathematics was the hardest hit, with a drop of eight points, the steepest decline in 50 years. Scores dropped for students of all races, sexes, socioeconomic classes, types of schools, and states with very few exceptions. This might be because mathematics education is more dependent upon the classroom experience than reading, as students who were allowed to return to in-person classes generally did better, more so in mathematics than in reading. However, on the topics of statistics and probability, student performance had already declined before the pandemic. As consequence, the entire cohort of college students in the 2022-23 academic year have lower average grades and mathematical standards. But there were noticeable improvements in mathematical proficiency among schoolchildren across the United States between 2022 and 2025.

A 2023 comparison between parents' views and standardized test scores revealed a significant gap; most parents overestimated their children's academic aptitude. In mathematics, only 26% were proficient, even though 90% of the parents asked thought their children met grade standards. Having a higher NAEP math score in eighth grade is correlated with high academic standing, higher income, lower rates of adolescent parenthood, and lower chances of criminality.

== Advanced Placement Mathematics ==
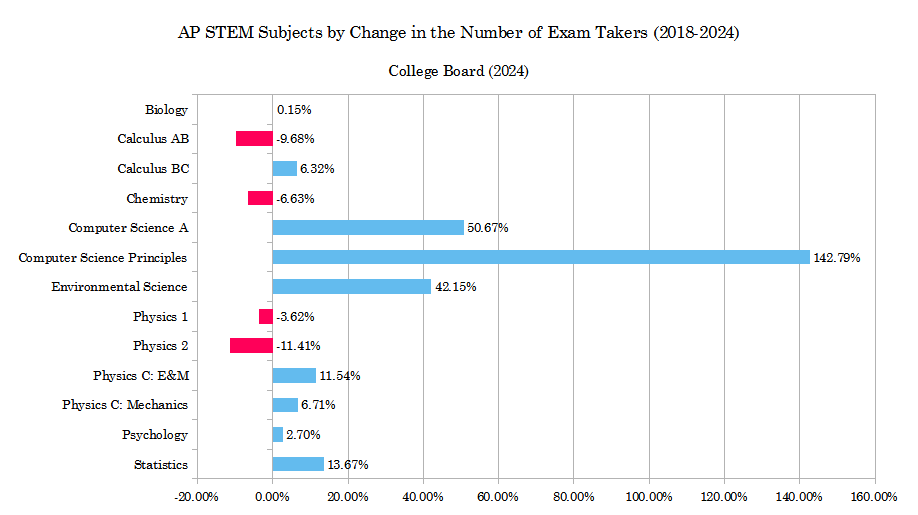
AP Calculus BC and AP Statistics exams saw an increase in the number of takers between 2018 and 2024.

There was considerable debate about whether or not calculus should be included when the Advanced Placement (AP) Mathematics course was first proposed in the early 1950s. AP Mathematics has eventually developed into AP Calculus thanks to physicists and engineers, who convinced mathematicians of the need to expose students in these subjects to calculus early on in their collegiate programs. By the mid-2020s, AP Calculus AB and AP Statistics are within the top ten most popular AP exams.

In the early 21st century, there has been a demand for the creation of AP Multivariable Calculus and indeed, a number of American high schools have begun to offer this class, giving colleges trouble in placing incoming students.

As of 2021, AP Precalculus was under development by the College Board, though there were concerns that universities and colleges would not grant credit for such a course, given that students had previously been expected to know this material prior to matriculation. AP Precalculus launched in Fall 2023. Attendance grew rapidly during the first few years. According to the College Board, majorities of students to took AP Precalculus went on to take AP Calculus AB or BC and at least on AP course in STEM or some other subject area.

== Conferences ==
Mathematics education research and practitioner conferences include: NCTM's Regional Conference and Exposition and Annual Meeting and Exposition; The Psychology of Mathematics Education's North American Chapter annual conference; and numerous smaller regional conferences.

== See also ==
- Project Mathematics!
- National Museum of Mathematics
- Stand and Deliver (1988 film)
- Math 55 at Harvard University
- Financial literacy curriculum
- Chicago movement
- Computer-Based Math and computer-based mathematics education
- American Mathematics Competitions
