= Common Core implementation by state =

US use of the 2010 educational initiative

A map showing states in the U.S. which have either adopted, not adopted, partially adopted, or repealed the Common Core State Standards: States that have adopted the Standards States that have partially adopted the Standards States that adopted but later repealed the Standards States that never adopted the Standards

Forty-six states initially adopted the Common Core State Standards, although implementation has not been uniform. At least 12 states have introduced legislation to repeal the standards outright, and 5 have since withdrawn from the standards.

Among the territories of the United States, the U.S. Virgin Islands, Guam, the Northern Mariana Islands, and the American Samoa Islands have adopted the standards while Puerto Rico has not adopted the standards.

== Alabama ==
Alabama initially adopted the Standards, but the state rescinded adoption in November 2013. Governor Robert Bentley cited federal interventions as a reason for his opposition, saying he was opposed because of "federal control of our education system. And I'm opposed to the Common Core because of the potential for federal intrusion." The state's curriculum, now called the College and Career Ready Standards, is still aligned with the Common Core standards.

== Alaska ==
Alaska opted out of adopting the Standards, as said in How the Alaska English/Language Arts and Mathematics Standards Differ from the Common Core State Standards, published by the Alaska Department of Education and Early Development (EED) "Alaska did not choose to adopt the CCSS; it was important to Alaskan educators to have the opportunity to adjust portions of the standards based on the unique context of our state." While debate persists in Alaska, the state has adopted its own new standards called the Alaska Content and Performance Standards that Education Commissioner Mike Hanley has described as "substantially similar" to the Common Core standards, and many local districts have chosen to adopt the standards even though the state has not. Parents have the right to opt their kids out of standardized testing.

== Arizona ==
Arizona formally adopted the Standards. In 2014, Governor Jan Brewer signed an executive order that removes references to "Common Core" from the state's math and reading standards, although they are still aligned with the national standards. The name of the standards have been changed to "Arizona's College and Career Ready Standards." In the legislature, the Senate Education Committee passed a bill that would withdraw Arizona from Common Core. As of October 26, 2015, the Arizona State Board of Education elected to repeal the Common Core standards in a 6-2 vote.

== Arkansas ==
Arkansas formally adopted the Standards in 2010. Multiple proposals during the 2014 fiscal year in the state legislature to delay implementation were not adopted. Arkansas is a governing member of PARCC.

== California ==
California formally adopted the Standards. Governor Jerry Brown allocated $1.25 billion in the state budget to assist with implementation, but also assured educators that Core-aligned tests will not be used as part of teacher evaluations through the 2015-2016 school year. The grant remains controversial with California teacher's unions because of concerns of the use and size of the grant.

== Colorado ==
Colorado formally adopted the Standards in 2010. Citizen concerns about Common Core, however, have resulted in a bill drafted by a parent group to delay implementation and appoint an independent panel to look at the standards, with State Senator Vicki Marble agreeing to carry it in the legislature.

== Connecticut ==
Connecticut formally adopted the Standards, but Governor Dannel Malloy has called for a delay in teacher evaluations based on Common Core testing, citing the stress of changing systems and saying "it's important that we relieve the significant demands on teachers and administrators and systems." In a public forum in Old Lyme, State Representative Marilyn Giuliano called on the state to "hit the pause button" on implementation, saying she had introduced legislation to delay implementation until legislators had heard feedback. Connecticut is a governing member of SBAC.

== Delaware ==
Delaware formally adopted the Standards as the ELA and math components of the Delaware Prioritized Standards. Implementation has been viewed as successful in the state. Delaware is a governing member of SBAC.

== District of Columbia ==
Washington, DC, has adopted the Standards. The District of Columbia's implementation is noteworthy for the speed and investment it made in the standards. The District of Columbia is a governing member of PARCC.

== Florida ==
Florida’s first set of statewide standards were the “Sunshine State Standards” (SSS) effective from 1993 through 2007. The “Sunshine State Standards” were revised in 2007, introducing Florida’s “Next Generation Sunshine State Standards” (NGSSS) effective from 2007 to 2010. In later years, as the “Common Core State Standards” were quickly being adopted across the country, Florida adopted this set of standards under a revised name, the “Florida Standards”, introduced in 2010. The “Florida Standards” were aligned with the “Common Core State Standards” but also included additional standards, such as cursive writing for Florida’s 3rd grade students. In the year 2019, when Florida Gov. Ron DeSantis took office, he pledged to “get rid of Common Core” and to have a full revision of the state standards ready by January 1, 2020. On January 31, 2019, Governor DeSantis issues Executive Order 19-32 “Commitment to Eliminating Common Core, Ensuring High-Quality Academic Standards and Raising the Bar for Civic Literacy”. This required the full revision and “overhaul of the current “Florida Standards”. On January 12, 2020, “Florida’s B.E.S.T. Standards” (for Math and English Language Arts) were adopted. This new set of academic standards, “Florida’s B.E.S.T. Standards” stand for the “Benchmarks For Excellent Student Thinking”. In order to “replace Common Core”, ordered by Gov. Ron DeSantis, “The State of Florida’s B.E.S.T. Standards” will be implemented in phases during the years of 2021-2023. These standards will provide major clarifications and explanations for the previously “Confusing Common Core State Standards”. Along with “Florida’s B.E.S.T. Standards”, new curriculum will be adopted and new assessment requirements will replace the current FSA (Florida Standards Assessment) tests. However the NGSSS Algebra 1 EOC, and Biology EOC will still remain. Additionally, a civic literacy test will be required for 12th graders beginning in 2021 and the elimination of the 9th Grade FSA ELA Reading Assessment and the 10th Grade NGSSS Geometry EOC Assessment will take place in 2022.

== Georgia ==
Georgia formally adopted the Standards, but withdrew from the associated tests in July 2013. While implementation had been on track for the state, State Senator William Ligon filed legislation to withdraw from the Common Core entirely. On 19 February 2015, Georgia formally renamed its standards the Georgia Standards of Excellence, which incorporate some revisions relative to the Common Core standards.

== Hawaii ==
Hawaii formally adopted the Standards, with full classroom implementation beginning in the 2013-14 school year and aligned assessment beginning in 2014-15. Hawaii is a governing member of SBAC.

== Idaho ==
Idaho formally adopted the Standards as the ELA and math components of the Idaho Core Standards. Idaho was a governing member of SBAC and began testing in 2014. Idaho replaced the Common Core standards in 2022.

== Illinois ==
Illinois formally adopted the Standards and rolled out implementation during the 2013-14 school year. Illinois is a governing member of PARCC.

== Indiana ==
Indiana initially adopted the Standards, but implementation was paused by law in May 2013. A bipartisan legislative panel failed to come to a consensus on continuing with the standards, and repeal legislation passed both the Indiana Senate and the State House Education Committee in February 2014, and the state formally withdrew from the Common Core in March 2014. The state published its replacement, the Indiana Academic Standards, in April 2014.

== Iowa ==
Iowa formally adopted the Standards as the ELA and math components of Iowa Core, the state's K-12 curriculum standards. Common Core was adopted in Iowa in 2010, with full implementation slated for completion in the 2014-2015 school year. Iowa is an affiliate member of SBAC.

== Kansas ==
Kansas formally adopted the Standards in 2010, but defunding legislation successfully passed the State Senate in July 2013, narrowly failing in the State House. House Bill 2621 was introduced in the 2014 legislative session, and would declare the standards, as well as the Next Generation science standards the state adopted in 2013, "null and void" in the state. However, as of 2015, the Common Core standards, with additions specified by the state Board of Education, remain part of the Kansas College and Career Ready Standards.

Kansas was formerly a member of SBAC, but the Kansas State Board of Education withdrew from the consortium in 2013, instead planning to commission its assessment development in-state from an institute at Kansas University. Testing using this instrument will begin in spring 2016.

== Kentucky ==
Kentucky was the first state to adopt Common Core in 2010 as part of the Kentucky Core Academic Standards, with curriculum rolled out in the 2011-12 school year. It was recently repealed in February 2017.

== Louisiana ==
Louisiana formally adopted the Standards, but delayed full Common Core implementation for two years in November 2013. Debate is expected when the state legislature convenes in March 2014, but testing is still scheduled to be implemented for the 2014-2015 school year. Governor Bobby Jindal has signaled an intention to end Common Core in the state, directing the Board of Education and the legislature to come up with an alternative that includes "Louisiana standards and a Louisiana test." Bobby Jindal curricular changes include rejection of the Common Core education standards for teaching English and math. In a response, several charter schools led by teachers and parents filed a lawsuit against the governor.

Louisiana is an affiliate member of PARCC and its state assessment "includes items developed through the PARCC process".

== Maine ==
Maine formally adopted the Standards. The Maine Equal Rights Center has launched a petition drive to add a question on the 2014 ballot that would remove Maine from Common Core, but Governor Paul LePage has shown support for the standards. Maine recently withdrew from SBAC.

== Maryland ==
Maryland formally adopted the Standards, although there has been significant resistance to the implementation in the state from educators, lawmakers, and citizens, including a planned push by State Republican legislators to withdraw from the consortium. Maryland is one of five states that has received permission from the federal government, under No Child Left Behind, to not test students under both Common Core and the state-level tests.

Legislation has also been filed in the state senate to delay teacher evaluation based on Common Core tests until the 2016-2017. This legislation is supported by the Maryland Superintendent of Schools Lillian Lowery. Another Senate bill has been filed that would leave teacher performance evaluations in the hands of local school boards.

Maryland is a governing member of PARCC.

== Massachusetts ==
Massachusetts formally adopted the Standards, but delayed transition to the Common Core for two years in November 2013.

== Michigan ==
Michigan formally adopted the Standards, although implementation was paused for a time and was later approved to continue without the Smarter Balanced testing. Michigan is a governing member of SBAC.

== Minnesota ==
Minnesota partially adopted the Standards. The state chose to adopt the English standards only, rejecting the math standards in favor of their own.

== Mississippi ==
Mississippi formally adopted the Standards.

Mississippi is an affiliate member of PARCC.

== Missouri ==
Missouri formally adopted the Standards. Opposition to Common Core has been labeled as paranoia by some state legislators, causing one State Representative on the education panel to add an $8 appropriation for "two rolls of high density aluminum to create headgear designed to deflect drone and/or black helicopter mind reading and control technology." Missouri is a governing member of SBAC.

== Montana ==
Montana formally adopted the Standards. Multiple Montana education award winners wrote an opinion piece supporting Common Core, and, among educators and legislators, adoption has gone smoothly, but there has been pushback by some who voice concern about state sovereignty and that implementation violates the Montana State Constitution. Montana is a governing member of SBAC.

== Nebraska ==
Nebraska did not adopt the Standards. Reasons cited for not adopting included skepticism about the math standards and the lack of formalized standards being available at the time of adoption.

== Nevada ==
Nevada formally adopted the Standards in 2012. There has been no significant opposition to the implementation, but the Department of Education launched a messaging campaign in February 2014 to quell a growing backlash in Northern Nevada. Nevada is a governing member of SBAC.

== New Hampshire ==
New Hampshire formally adopted the Standards. A bill to withdraw from the standards is currently in the New Hampshire House of Representatives, but the state is still on track to begin testing in Spring 2015. New Hampshire is a governing member of SBAC.

== New Jersey ==
New Jersey formally adopted the Standards. New Jersey's Board of Education has repeatedly passed resolutions reaffirming their commitment to the standards.

New Jersey is a governing member of PARCC. But the state has since left PARCC for the NJSLA in 2019.

== New Mexico ==
New Mexico formally adopted the Standards. New Mexico is a governing member of PARCC.

== New York ==
New York formally adopted the Standards. The State Board of Regents delayed implementation for five extra years in February 2014 to give schools more time to implement, as well as offering teachers two years amnesty from being evaluated on the standards. This delay means that the standards will not be a requirement for high school students until 2022. Issues have also prompted the state's leading teacher union, New York State Teachers United, to withdraw their support of the standards "as implemented," also calling for the resignation of State Education Commissioner John King and a three-year moratorium on testing. Other implementation actions have occurred, however, with Governor Andrew Cuomo convening an oversight panel.

New York is a governing member of PARCC, but is not yet using their assessments statewide; in 2015 they are piloting the test in 25 schools.

== North Carolina ==
North Carolina formally adopted the Standards. The state was one of the first to adopt the standards, but hearings were held in 2014 to discuss the future of the standards in the state, with Lieutenant Governor Dan Forest calling for a commission to complete a detailed review of the standards. The North Carolina general assembly will consider a bill in May 2014 that would result in North Carolina moving away from the standards while creating a new set of educational standards to replace it. North Carolina is an affiliate member of SBAC.

== North Dakota ==
North Dakota formally adopted the Standards. A Bill proposed in the state legislature on 2/12/2015 to eliminate common core in the state schools was defeated 46-48. North Dakota is a governing member of SBAC.

== Ohio ==
Ohio formally adopted the Standards. In 2013, legislation was filed by Ohio Republicans to bar adoption of the standards. Another bill was introduced in January 2014 to end testing of students. In 2015, Ohio withdrew from PARCC.

== Oklahoma ==
Oklahoma formally adopted the Standards, but tentatively withdrew from the associated tests in July 2013. Multiple bills had been introduced in the Oklahoma legislature to repeal the standards, and the standards were officially repealed in June 2014.

== Oregon ==
Oregon State Board of Education formally adopted the Standards on October 28, 2010, one of the first states to do so. Oregon is a governing member of SBAC.

== Pennsylvania ==
Pennsylvania formally adopted the Standards, but Governor Tom Corbett paused implementation in May 2013 after finding a split among lawmaker opinion, and the state has announced they are withdrawing from associated tests.

== Rhode Island ==
Rhode Island formally adopted the Standards, but, as of February 2014, calls for delays or repeal have increased, with State Representative Gregg Amore introducing legislation that would delay implementation. Rhode Island is a governing member of PARCC.

== South Carolina ==
South Carolina formally adopted the Standards, although the standards have been controversial. Governor Nikki Haley criticized the standards, saying "We don’t ever want to educate South Carolina children like they educate California children." A bill to repeal the standards beginning in the 2015-2016 school year was officially signed by Governor Haley in June 2014 after deliberation in the state legislature.

== South Dakota ==
South Dakota formally adopted the Standards. Multiple bills addressing Common Core are in the State Senate, but a bill that would have replaced Common Core with a different state standard was defeated in committee. South Dakota is a governing member of SBAC.

== Tennessee ==
Tennessee formally adopted the Standards. According to polling done by the Tennessee Consortium on Research, Evaluation and Development, teachers in Tennessee have a positive outlook on the standards and implementation. The Bradley County Commission, however, voted to back bills in the Tennessee House and Senate that would "discontinue the use of the Common Core state standards." Multiple proposals have been filed to scale back, delay, or outright repeal the standards in Tennessee. Tennessee passed a law to phase out common core in 2016. The new standard, The Tennessee Academic Standards, were implemented in English and Math for the 2017/2018 school year.

== Texas ==
Texas did not adopt the Standards, and is not a member of the consortium. Governor Rick Perry opposed adoption in 2010, citing issues of states rights, federal intrusion in education, implementation costs, and "the adoption of unproven, cost-prohibitive national standards and tests."

== Utah ==
Utah formally adopted the Standards, but withdrew from the Smarter Balanced Assessment Consortium in August 2012.

== Vermont ==
Vermont formally adopted the Standards. Vermont is a governing member of SBAC.

== Virginia ==
Virginia did not adopt the Standards, and is not a member of the consortium. While the Virginia Board of Education opposed adoption, stating that they were "committed to the Virginia Standards of Learning (SOL) program and opposed to adoption of the newly developed Common Core State Standards as a prerequisite for participation in federal competitive grant and entitlement programs," a state evaluation found that the Standards of Learning were "generally aligned" with Common Core.

== Washington ==
Washington formally adopted the Standards. Washington is a governing member of SBAC.

== West Virginia ==
West Virginia formally adopted the Standards. West Virginia renamed the standards "West Virginia's Next Generation Content Standards," and two bills have been filed in the state legislature. One bill, House Bill 4383, would delay implementation until 2016. The other, House Bill 4390, would withdraw West Virginia from Common Core completely. West Virginia is a governing member of SBAC.

== Wisconsin ==
Wisconsin formally adopted the Standards. A bill was fast-tracked in the legislature that would have repealed the standards in Wisconsin, but it was pulled from the floor in February 2014. It is believed that the bill will be reconsidered in March 2014. Governor Scott Walker supports the bill, while the Wisconsin Schools Superintendent Tony Evers has written to the legislature in opposition. Wisconsin is a governing member of SBAC.

== Wyoming ==
Wyoming formally adopted the Standards. A bill in the State House of Representatives would convene a panel of parents and educators to consider the future of Common Core in the state, as well as prohibits the state from entering into the Smarter Balanced Assessment Consortium. Wyoming is an affiliate member of SBAC.
