= Chicago movement =

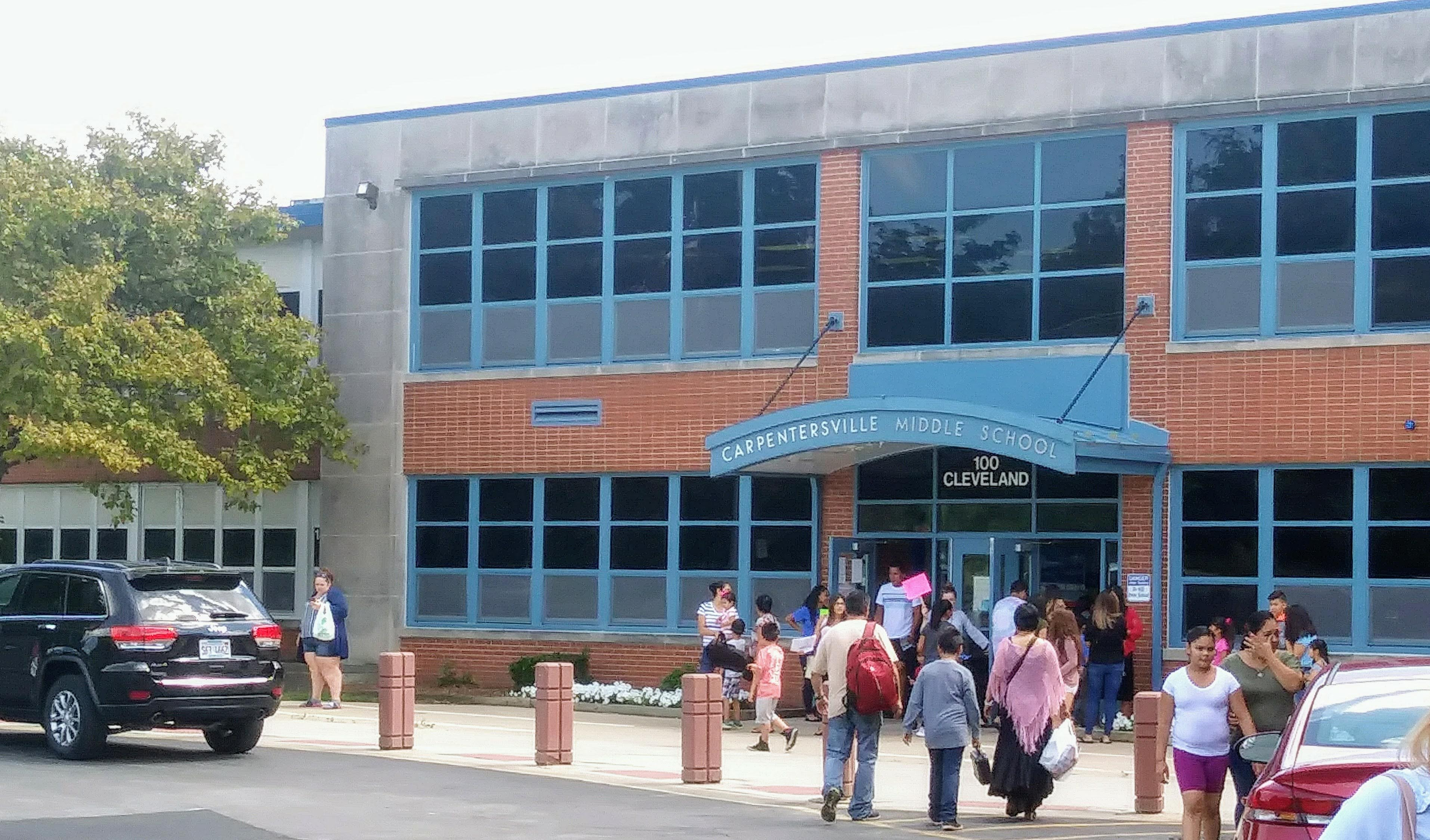
A Chicago secondary school

The Chicago movement was an educational reform initiative in Illinois during the early 20th century that attempted to create a unified mathematics curriculum in secondary schools.

Between 1890 and 1930 in Illinois, an educational reform movement advocating for an integrated approach to teaching mathematics, as opposed to dividing between subjects like algebra and geometry, began to form. The movement reached its peak in Illinois secondary schools during the early 20th century, where it became known as the "Chicago movement" due to its concentration in that area. According to educational science professor George Malaty, the movement faced criticism "because it did not care about the need for continuity of studying each branch, especially geometry, as a structure" and was considered "just a temporary fashion."

Though the Chicago movement was relatively short-lived, its challenges to mathematics curriculum integration later resurfaced during the New Math movement of the 1950s and 1960s.

== See also ==
- Computer-based mathematics education
- Mathematics education
- Mathematics education in the United States
