= AP Precalculus =

Advanced Placement course and exam

Advanced Placement (AP) Precalculus (also known as AP Precalc) is an Advanced Placement precalculus course and examination, offered by the College Board, in development since 2021 and announced in May 2022. The course debuted in the fall of 2023, with the first exam session taking place in May 2024. The course and examination are designed to teach and assess precalculus concepts, as a foundation for a wide variety of STEM fields and careers, and are not solely designed as preparation for future mathematics courses such as AP Calculus AB/BC. AP Precalculus is currently one of the exams that have fastest growth in number of test takers.

== Purpose ==
According to the College Board,

Offering a college-level precalculus course in high school will give students a new and valuable option for improving math readiness and staying on track for college.

AP Precalculus centers on functions modeling dynamic phenomena. This research-based exploration of functions is designed to better prepare students for college-level calculus and provide grounding for other mathematics and science courses. In this course, students study a broad spectrum of function types that are foundational for careers in mathematics, physics, biology, health science, social science, and data science. Furthermore, as AP Precalculus may be the last mathematics course of a student's secondary education, the course is structured to provide a coherent capstone experience and is not exclusively focused on preparation for future courses.

== Topic outline ==
=== Unit 1: Polynomial and Rational Functions (6–6.5 weeks) ===
#	Topic Title	Recommended Instructional Periods
1.1	Change in Tandem	2
1.2	Rates of Change	2
1.3	Rates of Change in Linear and Quadratic Functions	2
1.4	Polynomial Functions and Rates of Change	2
1.5	Polynomial Functions and Complex Zeros	2
1.6	Polynomial Functions and End Behavior	1
1.7	Rational Functions and End Behavior	2
1.8	Rational Functions and Zeros	1
1.9	Rational Functions and Vertical Asymptotes	1
1.10	Rational Functions and Holes	1
1.11	Equivalent Representations of Polynomial and Rational Expressions	2
1.12	Transformations of Functions	2
1.13	Function Model Selection and Assumption Articulation	2
1.14	Function Model Construction and Application	2

=== Unit 2: Exponential and Logarithmic Functions (6–6.5 weeks) ===
#	Topic Title	Recommended Instructional Periods
2.1	Change in Arithmetic and Geometric Sequences	2
2.2	Change in Linear and Exponential Functions	2
2.3	Exponential Functions	1
2.4	Exponential Function Manipulation	2
2.5	Exponential Function Context and Data Modeling	2
2.6	Competing Function Model Validation	2
2.7	Composition of Functions	2
2.8	Inverse Functions	2
2.9	Logarithmic Expressions	1
2.10	Inverses of Exponential Functions	2
2.11	Logarithmic Functions	1
2.12	Logarithmic Function Manipulation	2
2.13	Exponential and Logarithmic Equations and Inequalities	3
2.14	Logarithmic Function Context and Data Modeling	2
2.15	Semi-log Plots	2

=== Unit 3: Trigonometric and Polar Functions (7–7.5 weeks) ===
#	Topic Title	Recommended Instructional Periods
3.1	Periodic Phenomena	2
3.2	Sine, Cosine, and Tangent	2
3.3	Sine and Cosine Function Values	2
3.4	Sine and Cosine Function Graphs	2
3.5	Sinusoidal Functions	2
3.6	Sinusoidal Function Transformations	2
3.7	Sinusoidal Function Context and Data Modeling	2
3.8	The Tangent Function	2
3.9	Inverse Trigonometric Functions	2
3.10	Trigonometric Equations and Inequalities	3
3.11	The Secant, Cosecant, and Cotangent Functions	2
3.12	Equivalent Representations of Trigonometric Functions	2
3.13	Trigonometry and Polar Coordinates	2
3.14	Polar Function Graphs	2
3.15	Rates of Change in Polar Functions	2

=== Unit 4: Functions Involving Parameters, Vectors, and Matrices (7–7.5 weeks) ===
#	Topic Title	Recommended Instructional Periods
4.1	Parametric Functions	2
4.2	Parametric Functions Modeling Planar Motion	2
4.3	Parametric Functions and Rates of Change	2
4.4	Parametrically Defined Circles and Lines	2
4.5	Implicitly Defined Functions	2
4.6	Conic Sections	3
4.7	Parametrization of Implicitly Defined Functions	2
4.8	Vectors	3
4.9	Vector-Valued Functions	1
4.10	Matrices	2
4.11	The Inverse and Determinant of a Matrix	2
4.12	Linear Transformations and Matrices	1
4.13	Matrices as Functions	3
4.14	Matrices Modeling Contexts	3

Note that Unit 4 will not be tested on the AP Precalculus exam.

== Exam ==
The exam is composed of 2 sections, each with 2 different types of questions.

Section I consists of 42 multiple choice (MCQ) questions. 29 do not allow the use of a calculator, while the last 13 do allow a calculator. The non-calculator section is worth 43.75% of the exam score, while the calculator section is worth 18.75%.

Section II of the Exam includes 4 free response (FRQ) questions, with 2 not allowing a calculator and 2 allowing use of a calculator. Section II is worth 37.5% of the exam score, with the non-calculator and calculator sections weighed equally.

AP Precalculus exams will be scored on the standard 1–5 AP scale, with 5 signifying that the student is "extremely well qualified" for equivalent college credit and 1 signifying "no recommendation."

AP Precalculus students will be tested on Unit 1, Unit 2, and Unit 3, excluding Unit 4.

As of 2026, the exam format of AP Precalculus has formatting changes in timing and number of questions and will take effective on the May 2027 exam and beyond. The MCQ section increases from 40 to 42 questions, while the FRQ section remains unchanged.

=== Exam Format ===
	Multiple-Choice Section, Part A	Multiple-Choice Section, Part B	10-minute break	Free-Response Section, Part A	Free-Response Section, Part B
Exam Weighting	62.5% of exam score		10-minute break	37.5% of exam score	
# of questions	29	13	10-minute break	2	2
Timing	65 minutes	40 minutes	10-minute break	35 minutes	35 minutes
Graphing Calculator	Not Permitted	Allowed	10-minute break	Allowed	Not Permitted

=== Score distribution ===
All information comes from the official College Board website.

Score	2024	2025	2026
5	25.9%	28.1%	29%
4	23.9%	25.8%	29%
3	25.9%	26.8%	24%
2	14.6%	11.2%	11%
1	9.8%	8%	7%
% of scores 3 or higher	75.6%	80.8%	82%
Mean	3.42	3.55	
Standard deviation	1.28		
Number of students	184,394	253,596	300,000

== See also ==
- Mathematics education in the United States
- AP Calculus
