= AP Calculus =

Two Advanced Placement courses and exams

Logo of AP Calculus as of 2026

Advanced Placement (AP) Calculus (also known as AP Calc, Calc AB / BC, AB / BC Calc or simply AB / BC) is a set of two distinct Advanced Placement calculus courses and exams offered by the American nonprofit organization College Board. AP Calculus AB covers basic introductions to limits, derivatives, and integrals. AP Calculus BC covers all AP Calculus AB topics plus integration by parts, infinite series, parametric equations, and polar coordinate functions, among other topics.

== AP Calculus AB ==
AP Calculus AB is an Advanced Placement calculus course. It is traditionally taken after precalculus and is the first calculus course offered at most schools except for possibly a regular or honors calculus class. The Pre-Advanced Placement pathway for math helps prepare students for further Advanced Placement classes and exams.

=== Purpose ===
According to the College Board:

An AP course in calculus consists of a full high school academic year of work that is comparable to calculus courses in colleges and universities. It is expected that students who take an AP course in calculus will seek college credit, college placement, or both, from institutions of higher learning. The AP Program includes specifications for two calculus courses and the exam for each course. The two courses and the two corresponding exams are designated as Calculus AB and Calculus BC. Calculus AB can be offered as an AP course by any school that can organize a curriculum for students with advanced mathematical ability.

AP Calculus AB is approximately equivalent to the first semester of college calculus, providing students with an opportunity to earn college credit or advanced placement. Research indicates that achieving higher scores on the exam can positively impact college completion rates by facilitating credit toward graduation requirements.

=== Score Distribution ===
Score	2017	2018	2019	2020	2021	2022	2023	2024	2025	2026
5	18.7%	19.4%	19.1%	19.5%	17.6%	20.4%	22.4%	21.4%	20.3%	20.0%
4	18%	17.3%	18.7%	20.9%	14.1%	16.1%	16.2%	27.8%	28.9%	28.0%
3	20.8%	21%	20.6%	21.0%	19.3%	19.1%	19.4%	15.3%	15.0%	17.0%
2	22%	22.4%	23.3%	24.1%	25.3%	22.6%	21.7%	22.7%	22.8%	24.0%
1	20.4%	20%	18.3%	14.5%	23.7%	21.7%	20.3%	12.9%	13.0%	11.0%
% of Scores ≥3	57.5%	57.7%	58.4%	61.4%	51.0%	55.7%	58.0%	64.4%	64.2%	65.0%
Mean	2.93	2.94	2.97	3.07	2.77	2.91	2.99	3.22	3.21	
Standard Deviation	1.40	1.40	1.38	1.36	1.41	1.44	1.44	1.35	1.34	
Number of Students	316,099	308,538	300,659	266,430	251,639	268,352	273,987	278,657	286,722	292,000

== AP Calculus BC ==
AP Calculus BC is equivalent to a full-year regular college course, covering both Calculus I and Calculus II. After passing the exam, students may move on to Calculus III (Multivariable Calculus).

=== Purpose ===
According to the College Board,

Calculus BC is a full-year course in the calculus of functions of a single variable. It includes all topics covered in Calculus AB plus additional topics... Students who take an AP Calculus course should do so with the intention of placing out of a comparable college calculus course.

The course is designed for students with strong mathematical ability, aiming to provide advanced placement or credit equivalent to two semesters of college calculus.

=== Score Distribution ===
Score	2017	2018	2019	2020	2021	2022	2023	2024	2025	2026
5	42.6%	40.4%	43.0%	44.6%	38.3%	41.2%	43.5%	47.7%	44.0%	46.0%
4	18.1%	18.6%	18.5%	17.6%	16.5%	15.6%	15.9%	21.1%	21.9%	22.0%
3	19.9%	20.7%	19.5%	19.4%	20.4%	20.1%	19.0%	12.1%	12.8%	14.0%
2	14.3%	14.6%	13.9%	14.1%	18.2%	16.4%	15.2%	13.9%	15.2%	14.0%
1	5.3%	5.6%	5.2%	4.3%	6.6%	6.8%	6.3%	5.2%	6.2%	4.0%
% of Scores 3 or Higher	80.6%	79.7%	81.0%	81.6%	75.2%	76.9%	78.5%	80.9%	78.6%	82.0%
Mean	3.79	3.73	3.81	3.84	3.62	3.68	3.75	3.92	3.82	
Standard Deviation	1.28	1.28	1.27	1.25	1.33	1.33	1.32	1.27	1.30	
Number of Students	132,514	139,376	139,195	127,864	124,599	120,238	135,458	148,191	160,954	171,000

It can be seen from the tables that the pass rate (score of 3 or higher) of AP Calculus BC is higher than AP Calculus AB. It can also be noted that about 1/2 as many take the BC exam as take the AB exam. A possible explanation for the higher scores on BC is that students who take AP Calculus BC are more prepared and advanced in math, often self-selecting into the course due to greater intrinsic motivation and prior achievement. The 5-rate is consistently over 40% (much higher than almost all the other AP exams). In 2025, AP Calculus BC was rated as one of the most satisfying AP exams by students, with an average satisfaction score of 8 out of 10.

==== AB sub-score distribution ====
Score	2017	2018	2019	2020	2021	2022	2023	2024	2025	2026
5	48.4%	48.7%	49.5%	N/A	46.7%	48.5%	46.4%	50.1%	47.7%	67%
4	22.5%	20.2%	23.5%	N/A	17.7%	20.9%	19.6%	29.7%	30.5%	12%
3	14.1%	15.9%	13.2%	N/A	16.0%	11.8%	18.8%	8.4%	9.8%	5.9%
2	10.0%	9.9%	9.7%	N/A	13.0%	12.2%	8.6%	9.2%	9.0%	5%
1	4.9%	5.3%	4.2%	N/A	6.6%	6.7%	6.6%	2.6%	3.0%	.1%
% of Scores 3 or Higher	85.0%	84.8%	86.2%	N/A	80.4%	81.2%	84.8%	88.2%	88.0%	94.9%
Mean	4.00	3.97	4.05	N/A	3.85	3.92	3.91	4.16	4.11	4.67%
Standard Deviation	1.21	1.23	1.18	N/A	1.31	1.30	1.26	1.08	1.09	1.13
Number of Students	132,505	139,376	139,195	N/A	124,607	120,276	135,458	148,191	160,953	170,000

== Topic Outline ==
AP Calculus AB and Calculus BC cover the core concepts of differential and integral calculus. The Calculus BC curriculum includes the entire Calculus AB curriculum while extending it with additional advanced topics. Together, the course covers the core concepts of differential and integral calculus, including limits, derivatives, applications of diferentiation, integrals, differential equations, and applications of integration. The BC-only curriculum further explores parametric equations, polar coordinates, vector-valued functions, advanced integration techniques, improper integrals, and infinite sequences and series, including Taylor and Maclaurin series.

#	Topic	Note	Exam Weighting (AB)	Exam Weighting (BC)
Unit 1	Limits and Continuity		10-15%	5-10%
Unit 2	Differentiation: Definition and Fundamental Properties		10-15%	5-10%
Unit 3	Differentiation: Composite, Implicit, and Inverse Functions		5-10%	5-10%
Unit 4	Contextual Applications of Differentiation		10-15%	5-10%
Unit 5	Analytical Applications of Differentiation		15-20%	10-15%
Unit 6	Integration and Accumulation of Change	BC-only for some lessons	15-20%	15-20%
Unit 7	Differential Equations	BC-only for some lessons	5-10%	5-10%
Unit 8	Applications of Integration	BC-only for some lessons	10-15%	5-10%
Unit 9	Parametric Equations, Polar Coordinates, and Vector-Valued Functions	BC-only		10-15%
Unit 10	Infinite Sequences and Series	BC-only		15-20%

== Examination ==
The College Board intentionally schedules the AP Calculus AB exam at the same time as the AP Calculus BC exam to make it impossible for a student to take both tests in the same academic year, though the College Board does not make AP Calculus AB a prerequisite class for AP Calculus BC. Some schools do this, though many others only require AP Precalculus or Algebra 2 as a prerequisite for Calculus BC. The AP awards given by College Board count both exams. However, they do not count the AB sub-score piece of the BC exam. AP exam scores, including for Calculus, serve as strong predictors of college performance and are valued in admissions processes at various institutions.

The AP Calculus AB and BC are hybrid digital exams, meaning that students are required to answer the multiple choice (MCQ) on the Bluebook testing application and handwrite their answers for free response (FRQ) on the exam booklets.

=== Exam Format ===
The structures of the AB and BC exams are identical. Both exams are three hours and ten minutes long, comprising a total of 42 multiple choice (MCQ) questions, 6 free response (FRQ) questions, and a 10 minute scheduled break between the two sections. They are usually administered on a Monday or Tuesday morning in May.

	Multiple-Choice, Section I Part A	Multiple-Choice, Section I Part B	10 minute break	Free-Response, Section II Part A	Free-Response, Section II Part B
# of Questions	29	13	10 minute break	2	4
Time Allowed	62 minutes	38 minutes	10 minute break	30 minutes	60 minutes
Calculator Use	No	Yes	10 minute break	Yes	No

The two parts of the multiple choice (MCQ) section are timed and taken independently.

Students are required to put away their calculators after 30 minutes have passed during the free-response (FRQ) section, and only at that point may begin Section II Part B. However, students may continue to work on Section II Part A during the entire free-response (FRQ) time, although without a calculator during the later two thirds.

In 2026, the AP Calculus AB and BC exam structure has official updates scheduled to take effect in 2026-2027 school year, applying to the May 2027 exams and beyond. The multiple-choice (MCQ) section decreased from 45 to 42 total questions.

=== Scoring ===
The multiple choice (MCQ) section is scored by computer, with a correct answer receiving 1 point, with omitted and incorrect answers not affecting the raw score. This total is multiplied by 1.2 to calculate the adjusted multiple-choice (MCQ) score.

The free response (FRQ) section is hand-graded by hundreds of AP teachers and professors each June. The raw score is then added to the adjusted multiple choice (MCQ) score to receive a composite score. This total is compared to a composite-score scale for that year's exam and converted into an AP score of 1 to 5. The cutoff required for the score 5 is fluctuated around 60-65% of the total composite-score scale (out of 108), depending on the difficulty of the exam and cohort's performance.

For the Calculus BC exam, an AB sub-score is included in the score report to reflect their proficiency in the common topics of introductory calculus. The AB sub-score is based on the correct number of answers for questions pertaining to AB-material only.

== History ==
There was considerable debate about whether or not calculus should be included when the Advanced Placement Mathematics course was first proposed in the early 1950s. AP Mathematics was eventually developed into AP Calculus thanks to physicists and engineers, who convinced mathematicians of the need to expose students in these subjects to calculus early on in their collegiate programs. The AP program originated in the 1950s amid Cold War concerns over educational rigor, with the first AP exams piloted in 1954 and nationally rolled out in 1956, including Mathematics as one of the original ten subjects. AP Calculus was established in 1955 as a single exam covering a full year of college-level calculus; in 1969, the AB exam was introduced for the first semester, while the original became BC. The program grew rapidly from the 1980s, with exam takership increasing fivefold by the mid-1990s, and by 2019, over 450,000 students took AP Calculus annually, representing about 20% of U.S. high school graduates. By the mid-2020s, AP Calculus AB was one of the top ten most popular AP exams.

In the early 21st century, there has been demand for the creation of AP Multivariable Calculus and indeed, a number of American high schools have begun to offer "Calculus III", giving colleges trouble in placing incoming students.

== See also ==
- AP Physics C: Mechanics and AP Physics C: Electricity and Magnetism
- AP Precalculus
- Glossary of calculus
- Mathematics education in the United States
- Stand and Deliver (1988 film)
