= Integrated mathematics =

Style of mathematics education

Integrated mathematics is the term used in the United States to describe the style of mathematics education which integrates many topics or strands of mathematics throughout each year of secondary school. Each math course in secondary school covers topics in algebra, geometry, trigonometry and functions. Nearly all countries throughout the world, except the United States, normally follow this type of integrated curriculum.

In the United States, topics are usually integrated throughout elementary school up to the seventh or sometimes eighth grade. Beginning with high school level courses, topics are usually separated so that one year a student focuses entirely on algebra (if it was not already taken in the eighth grade), the next year entirely on geometry, then another year of algebra (sometimes with trigonometry), and later an optional fourth year of precalculus or calculus. Precalculus is the exception to the rule, as it usually integrates algebra, trigonometry, and geometry topics. Statistics may be integrated into all the courses or presented as a separate course.

New York State began using integrated math curricula in the 1980s, but recently returned to a traditional curriculum. A few other localities in the United States have also tried such integrated curricula, including Georgia, which mandated them in 2008 but subsequently made them optional. More recently, a few other states have mandated that all districts change to integrated curricula, including North Carolina, West Virginia and Utah. Some districts in other states, including California, have either switched or are considering switching to an integrated curriculum.

Under the Common Core Standards adopted by most states in 2012, high school mathematics may be taught using either a traditional American approach or an integrated curriculum. The only difference would be the order in which the topics are taught. Supporters of using integrated curricula in the United States believe that students will be able to see the connections between algebra and geometry better in an integrated curriculum.

General mathematics is another term for a mathematics course organized around different branches of mathematics, with topics arranged according to the main objective of the course. When applied to primary education, the term general mathematics may encompass mathematical concepts more complex than basic arithmetic, like number notation, addition and multiplication tables, fractions and related operations, measurement units. When used in context of higher education, the term may encompass mathematical terminology and concepts, finding and applying appropriate techniques to solve routine problems, interpreting and representing practical information given in various forms, interpreting and using mathematical models, and constructing mathematical arguments to solve familiar and unfamiliar problems.
