= Smarter Balanced Assessment Consortium =

Educational organizations based in the United States

The Smarter Balanced Assessment Consortium (SBAC) is a standardized test consortium. It creates Common Core State Standards-aligned tests ("adaptive online exams") to be used in several states. It uses automated essay scoring. Its counterpart in the effort to become a leading multi-state test provider is the Partnership for the Assessment of Readiness for College and Careers (PARCC).

In 2010, the consortium was created. The Amplify technology company provides the digital technology for the tests. SBAC signed a contract with Amplify to create a digital library of formative assessment professional learning tools designed for Common Core State Standards teachers. Amplify also signed a contract with Smarter Balanced before its purchase by News Corp to develop reporting tools for teacher assessment.

== Member states ==
Member states in the consortium include:

- California (CAASPP)
- Connecticut
- Delaware
- Hawaii
- Idaho
- Indiana
- Maine
- Michigan (M-STEP)
- Montana
- Nevada
- New Hampshire
- North Dakota
- Oregon
- South Dakota
- Vermont
- Washington
- West Virginia
- Wisconsin

Iowa, North Carolina, and Wyoming are affiliate members. Previously, it had 30 members. Member states can associate with one or both consortia, without committing to using either test.

== Assessment ==
Beginning in the Spring of 2015, SBAC began assessing students with their new assessment format. The assessments are given in grades 3–8 and 10 (11 in California), in the content areas of Math and English Language Arts. Each test called a Summative Assessment, consists of a Performance Task (PT) and a Computer-Adaptive Test (CAT).

== See also ==
- Common Core State Standards Initiative
- High-stakes testing
