= Precalculus =

Course designed to prepare students for calculus

Diagram for the deriving the power-reducing formula for the sine function

In mathematics education, precalculus is a course, or a set of courses, that includes algebra and trigonometry at a level that is designed to prepare students for the study of calculus, thus the name precalculus (from pre-, 'beforehand'). Schools often distinguish between algebra and trigonometry as two separate parts of the coursework.

== Concept ==
For students to succeed at finding the derivatives and antiderivatives with calculus, they will need facility with algebraic expressions, particularly in modification and transformation of such expressions. Leonhard Euler wrote the first precalculus book in 1748 called Introductio in analysin infinitorum (Latin: Introduction to the Analysis of the Infinite), which "was meant as a survey of concepts and methods in analysis and analytic geometry preliminary to the study of differential and integral calculus." He began with the fundamental concepts of variables and functions. His innovation is noted for its use of exponentiation to introduce the transcendental functions. The general logarithm, to an arbitrary positive base, Euler presents as the inverse of an exponential function.

Then the natural logarithm is obtained by taking as base "the number for which the hyperbolic logarithm is one", sometimes called Euler's number, and written $e$. This appropriation of the significant number from Grégoire de Saint-Vincent’s calculus suffices to establish the natural logarithm. This part of precalculus prepares the student for integration of the monomial $x^p$ in the instance of $p = -1$.

Today's precalculus text computes $e$ as the limit $e = \lim_{n \rightarrow \infty} \left(1 + \frac{1}{n}\right)^{n}$.

This limit may be influenced by an explanation of compound interest in financial mathematics. The modern text avoids complex numbers, except in the case of their occurrence as roots of a quadratic equation with a negative discriminant or in Euler's formula as an application of trigonometry. Euler employs this distinction. In his precalculus, Euler used infinite series in addition to complex numbers. Today's course may cover arithmetic and geometric sequences and series, but not the application by Saint-Vincent to gain his hyperbolic logarithm, which Euler used to finesse his precalculus.

== Variable content ==
Precalculus prepares students for calculus somewhat differently from how pre-algebra prepares students for algebra. While pre-algebra often has extensive coverage of basic algebraic concepts, precalculus courses might see only small amounts of calculus concepts, if at all, and usually involve covering algebraic topics that might not have been given attention in earlier algebra courses. Some precalculus courses might differ from others in terms of content. For example, an honors-level course might spend more time on conic sections, Euclidean vectors, and other topics needed for calculus, used in fields such as medicine or engineering. A college preparatory/regular class might focus on topics used in business-related careers, such as matrices, or power functions.

A standard course considers functions, function composition, and inverse functions, often in connection with sets and real numbers. In particular, polynomials and rational functions are developed. Algebraic skills are exercised with trigonometric functions and trigonometric identities. The binomial theorem, polar coordinates, parametric equations, and the limits of sequences and series are other common topics of precalculus. Sometimes the mathematical induction method of proof for propositions dependent upon a natural number may be demonstrated, but generally, coursework involves exercises rather than theory.

== Sample texts ==
- George F. Simmons (1981) Precalculus Mathematics in a Nutshell
- Roland E. Larson & Robert P. Hostetler (1989) Precalculus, second edition, D.C. Heath and Company ISBN 0-669-16277-9
- Margaret L. Lial & Charles D. Miller (1988) Precalculus, Scott Foresman ISBN 0-673-15872-1
- Jerome E. Kaufmann (1988) Precalculus, PWS-Kent Publishing Company (Wadsworth)
- Karl J. Smith (1990) Precalculus Mathematics: a functional approach, fourth edition, Brooks/Cole ISBN 0-534-11922-0
- Michael Sullivan (1993) Precalculus, third edition, Dellen imprint of Macmillan Publishers ISBN 0-02-418421-7

=== Online access ===
- Jay Abramson and others (2014) Precalculus from OpenStax
- David Lippman & Melonie Rasmussen (2017) Precalculus: an investigation of functions
- Carl Stitz & Jeff Zeager (2013) Precalculus (pdf)

== See also ==
- AP Precalculus
- AP Calculus
- AP Statistics
- Pre-algebra
- Mathematics education in the United States
