= Pre-algebra =

Middle-school math class in the U.S.

A visual proof of the Pythagorean theorem

Pre-algebra is a common name for a middle school course in mathematics taught in the United States to students in the 6th, 7th, 8th, or 9th grade. The main objective of it is to prepare students for the study of algebra. Usually, Algebra I is taught in the 8th or 9th grade.

As an intermediate stage after arithmetic, pre-algebra helps students pass specific conceptual barriers. Students are introduced to the idea that an equals sign, rather than just being the answer to a question as in basic arithmetic, means that two sides are equivalent and can be manipulated together. They may also learn how numbers, variables, and words can be used in the same ways.

== Subjects ==
Subjects taught in a pre-algebra course may include:

- Review of natural number arithmetic
- Types of numbers such as integers, fractions, decimals and negative numbers
- Ratios and percents
- Factorization of natural numbers
- Properties of operations such as associativity and distributivity
- Simple (integer) roots and powers
- Rules of evaluation of expressions, such as operator precedence and use of parentheses
- Basics of equations, including rules for invariant manipulation of equations
- Understanding of variable manipulation
- Manipulation and plotting in the standard 4-quadrant Cartesian coordinate plane
- Powers in scientific notation (example: 340,000,000 in scientific notation is 3.4 × 10^{8})
- Identifying Probability
- Solving Square roots
- Pythagorean Theorem

Pre-algebra may include subjects from geometry, especially to further the understanding of algebra in applications to perimeter, area, and volume.

Pre-algebra may also include subjects from statistics to identify probability and interpret data.

Proficiency in pre-algebra is an indicator of college success. It can also be taught as a remedial course for college students, particularly in community colleges.

== Sample Text ==
- Prealgebra from openstax
- Szczepanski, Amy F. & Kositsky, Andrew P. 2008. The complete idiot's guide to pre-algebra.

== See also ==
- Precalculus
- Mathematics education in the United States
