= Integration Bee =

Annual integral calculus competition

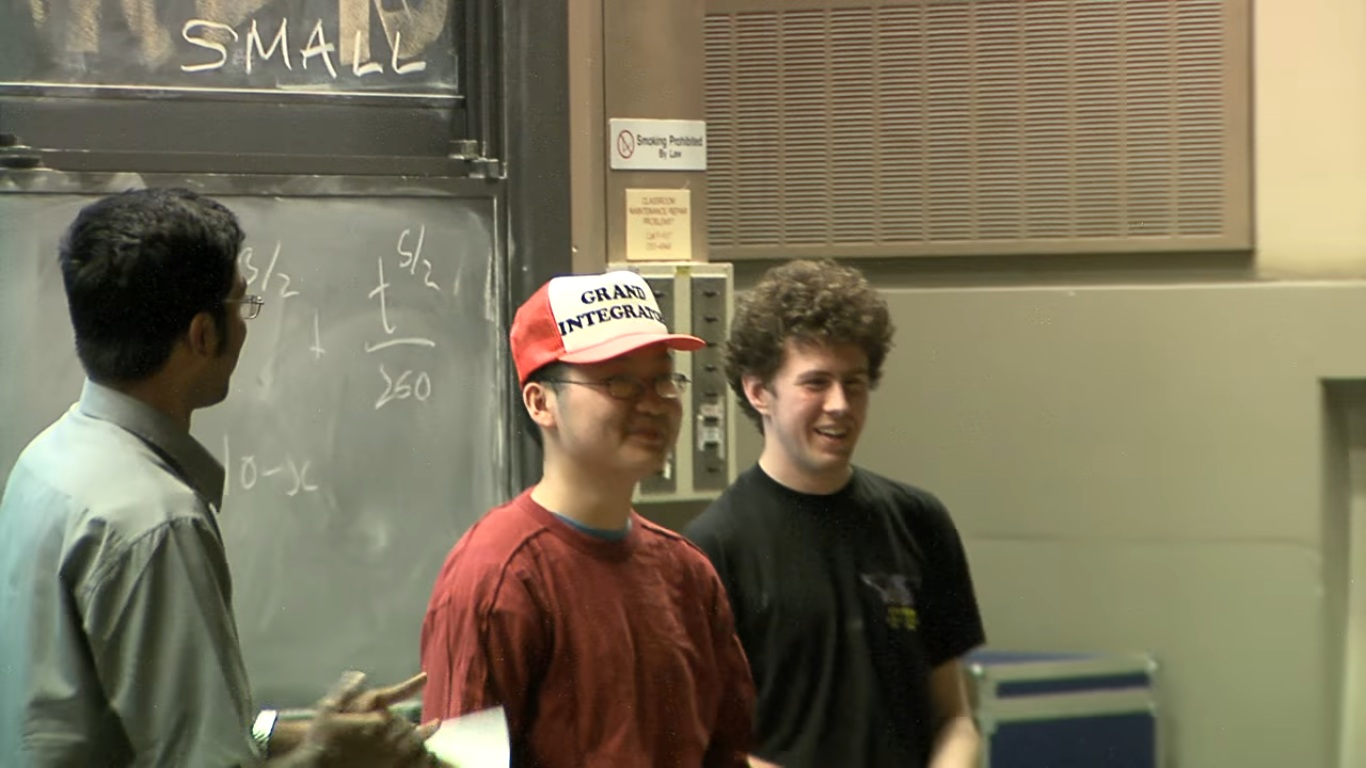
Finalists of the 2006 MIT Integration Bee, with the "Grand Integrator" in the middle.

The Integration Bee is an annual integral calculus competition pioneered in 1981 by Andy Bernoff, an applied mathematics student at the Massachusetts Institute of Technology (MIT). Similar contests are administered each year in many universities and colleges across the United States and in a number of other countries.

== Rules and conventions ==
Prospective participants may first need to take a qualifying exam. The contest is then arranged in a manner similar to a sports tournament, with those who incorrectly evaluate integrals after a certain number of trials being eliminated. Constants of integration may be ignored, but the final answer must be in reduced form and in terms of the original variable. At some institutions, such as MIT, contestants will evaluate assigned integrals on a chalkboard in front of the audience. In some others, such as the University of Connecticut, they may do so in their seats on paper. Contestants may either be all students from the hosting institution (such as MIT or the University of California, Berkeley), undergraduates only (such as at the University of Connecticut), or undergraduates and high-school students (such as at the University of North Texas), or all university students as well as high school students from the same area (such as West Virginia University). At the University of Dayton (Ohio), students compete in teams of two.

Participants are expected to be familiar with the standard methods of integration.

== U.S. competitions ==
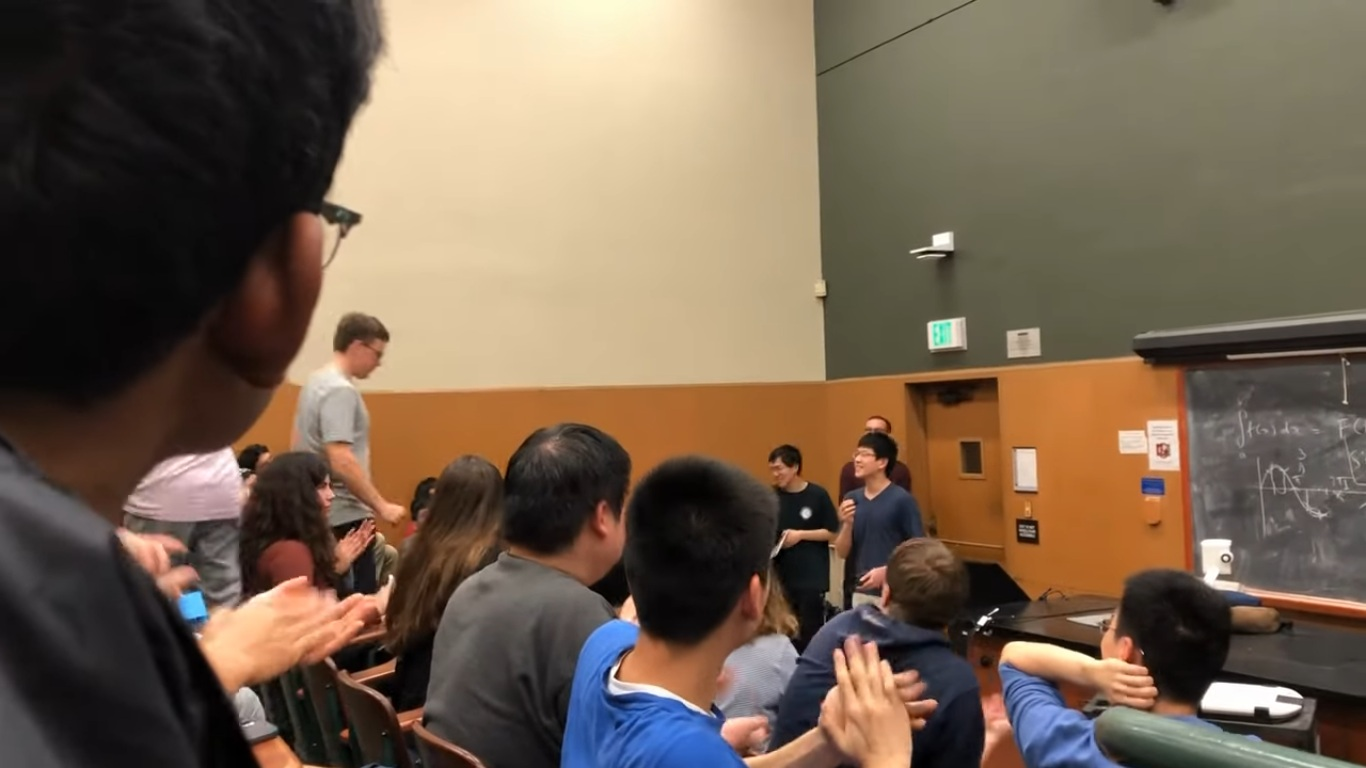
Viewers and participants of the 2020 Berkeley Integration Bee

Integration Bee contests continue to be held at MIT, with the champion awarded a hat carrying the title "Grand Integrator". Integration Bee contests are now regularly conducted in major American colleges and universities.

In the South, they are the University of Florida, Florida Polytechnic University, West Virginia University, Louisiana Tech University,, the University of North Texas, University of North Carolina at Chapel Hill, and North Carolina State University.

In the Northeast, they are the University of Scranton, Connecticut College, Central Connecticut State University, Columbia University, and the State University of New York.

In the Midwest, they are the University of Wisconsin–Madison, Prairie State College (Illinois), the University of Illinois at Urbana–Champaign, and the University of Dayton (Ohio).

In the West, they are Brigham Young University, Utah Valley University, Fresno State University, Cosumnes River College, the University of California, Berkeley, various other institutions in California, and Oregon State University.

The Louisiana/Mississippi chapter of the Mathematical Association of America is responsible for holding the Integration Bee in these two states and the American Mathematical Society at the University of Connecticut.

== Non-U.S. competitions ==
=== Africa ===
In Egypt, three integration bees were held in 2023. The first one was held by the Department of Mathematics at Cairo University in April. The second was held by the Department of Engineering of the same school; this event was open to freshmen only. The third was held in the Zewail City of Science, Technology and Innovation.

=== Asia ===
A Philippine integration competition (often shortened as Integ Bee) was originally held four times at the University of the Philippines Diliman, located in Quezon City, and sponsored by UP Physics Association (UPPA). Subsequently, the competition was scaled up to allow undergraduates of other Philippine universities to participate. One typical event in 2014 at the Philippine National Institute of Physics, allowed contestants to test their accuracy and speed, capability in mental solving, and mastery in evaluating integrals. The winner received a cash prize of 5,000 Philippine pesos (about €100 or US$113), whilst two runners-up received 1,000 pesos (about €20 or US$22).

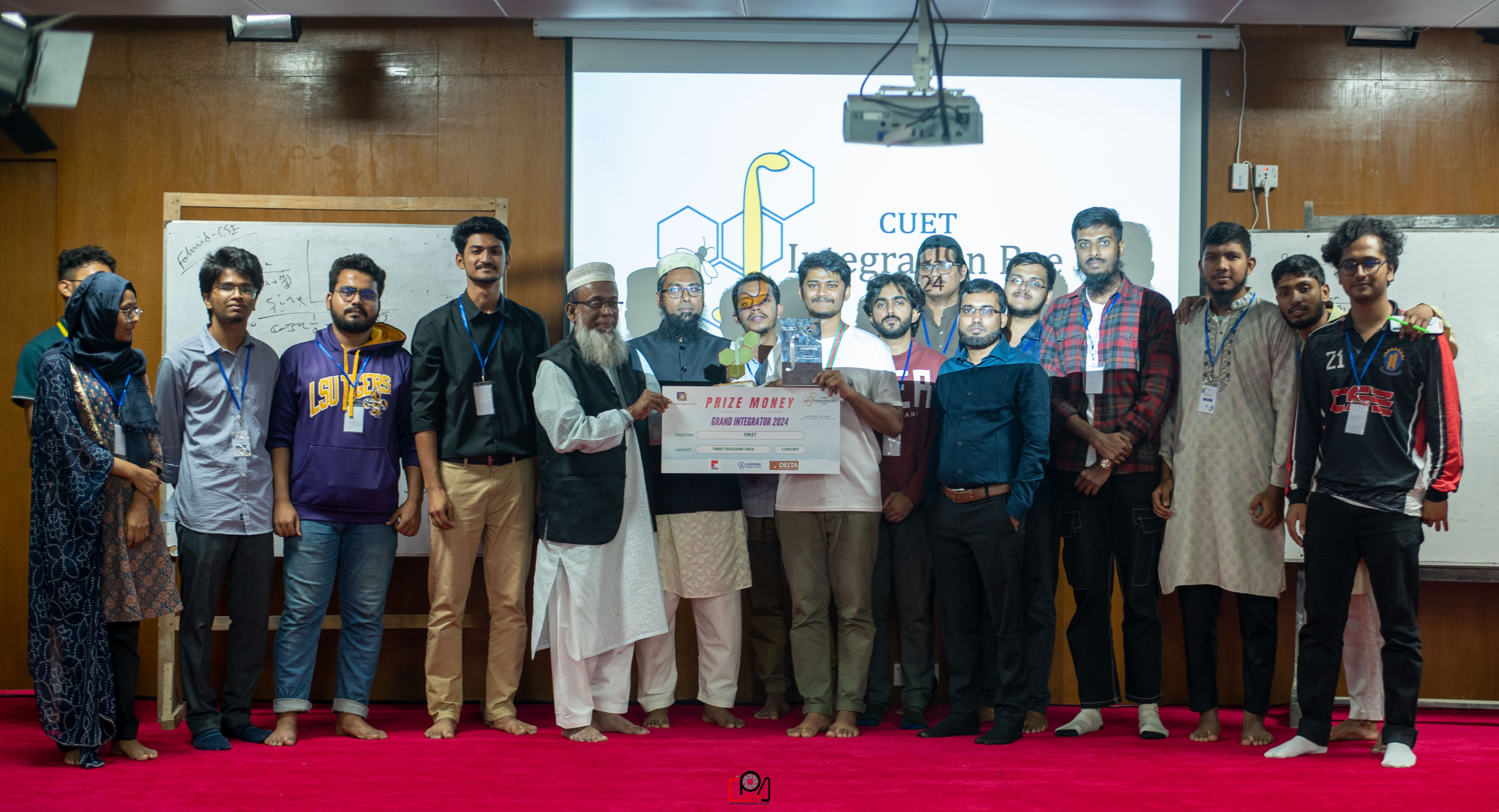
CUET Integration Bee 2024 Grand Finale

In Bangladesh, Chittagong University of Engineering & Technology (CUET) made history by organizing the country's first-ever Integration Bee competition in November 2024. The event featured two stages: an initial written round followed by a series of one-on-one matches. From the written round, 16 students advanced to compete in 1v1 duels, resulting in eight matches before the quarterfinals. The competition then progressed through the quarterfinals, semifinals, and a final match, with an additional match held to determine the second runner-up. The CUET Schrödinger Society, in collaboration with the Department of Mathematics, honored the top three participants, including the "Grand Integrator", with custom-designed metal crests and medals. All 16 finalists received uniquely crafted medals, and the top three winners were awarded prize money as part of the recognition for their achievements. The event was live-streamed on the official Facebook page of the CUET Integration Bee, allowing a wider audience to witness this innovative academic competition. Also in Qatar , CMUQ had organized two integration bees so far (2026/june).

=== Europe ===
In the United Kingdom, the Integration Bee is held at the University of Cambridge, which welcomes participants from other British universities, including University of Oxford, Imperial College London, Durham University and University of Warwick. Elsewhere in the English-speaking world, the contest is held at the University of New South Wales, Australia, and the Indian Institute of Science Education and Research, Pune.

In Poland, the Integration Bee has been adopted at the University of Warsaw under the name The Grand Integration Tournament UW (Wielki Turniej Całkowania UW). The tournament has been held annually since 2022 and is organized jointly by the Faculty Student Councils of Mathematics, Physics, and MISMaP. The event is sponsored by Jane Street, while the competition problems are prepared by the KPM (Mathematics Enthusiasts’ Society). Established traditions of the tournament include 3D-printed medals for the top three competitors, manufactured by the Faculty of Physics in Makerspace@UW, as well as the use of Hagoromo chalk.

In Switzerland, the Integration Bee was held at the École Polytechnique Fédérale de Lausanne (EPFL) in Lausanne for the first time in 2023, organized by Students 4 Students — a commission of AGEPoly, the student association of EPFL. The event is held each year at EPFL, and in 2026 was co-organized in collaboration with the Math Olympiad Club, a student association of ETH Zurich, with the competition live-streamed on YouTube.

In Austria, the Integration Bee Vienna was organized for the first time by two students Maksym Czarniecki & Samuel Krech in May 2024 and hosted at the faculty of mathematics of the University of Vienna.

In Germany, there have been various events in the style of an Integration Bee. In 2024, both Heidelberg University and the University of Bonn held their first competitions, in May and November, respectively.

In Spain, Barcelona (Catalonia, Spain), the Integration Bee takes place at Polytechnic University of Catalonia, inside the Math and Statistics Faculty (FME). Since 2023, the contest is held around the start or May. All editions have counted with more than 50 participants. Since 2025, there is also an Integration Bee in Madrid, which is organized by the Interdisciplinary Mathematics Institute, the Student Association Cometas and the Faculty of Mathematical Science of the Complutense University of Madrid.

In Lisbon, Portugal, the Integration Bee was organized for the first time in 2025 at Instituto Superior Técnico (IST) - Universidade de Lisboa, and adopted a format that allowed students to participate individually or in pairs.

=== South America ===
Grand Final of the 2025 UNI Bee Integration at the National University of Engineering, Lima

In Peru, an Integration Bee was held in 2025 at the National University of Engineering (UNI) in Lima, organized by UNICODE, a student cultural center of the Faculty of Industrial and Systems Engineering (FIIS). Contestants solved integrals live on a chalkboard in one-on-one elimination matches.

== Impact ==
While integral calculus is no longer an actively researched topic in mathematics, there is some correlation between success in the integration bee and success in other areas of mathematics. On a more individual level the winners of the integration bee are held in high honor by their colleagues and professors alike.

== See also ==
- List of mathematics competitions
- Math circle
- Mathematics education in the United States
- William Lowell Putnam Mathematical Competition
