= PARCC =

Consortium for K–12 assessments in Mathematics and English

The Partnership for Assessment of Readiness for College and Careers (PARCC) is a consortium that includes the US Department of Defense Educational Activity and the US Bureau of Indian Education. Consortium members work to create and deploy a standard set of K–12 assessments in Mathematics and English, based on the Common Core State Standards.

The PARCC consortium was awarded Race to the Top assessment funds in September 2010 by the U.S. Department of Education to help in the development of the K–12 assessments. PARCC has included educators in the development of its assessments and will consult with more than 200 postsecondary educators and administrators in the development of the assessments.

== Background ==
Before No Child Left Behind, The Elementary and Secondary Education Act was passed in 1965 as a part of the War on Poverty. In hopes of diminishing the achievement gap, the Elementary and Secondary Education Act was passed to create equal opportunity and access to education through high standards and accountability. These standards and accountability techniques came in the form of standardized testing. For the first time, federal money was being sent into local schools and made the production of test-based evidence mandatory for all educators. Standards were being assessed on these state-created exams, and local schools were then accountable to perform on these exams. In 2002, Congress re-examined ESEA and reauthorized it as No Child Left Behind Act (NCLB).

ESEA created the accountability tool known as Adequate Yearly Progress (AYP). AYP is a required statewide accountability system which requires each state to ensure that all schools and districts make AYP. AYP is simply a “statewide accountability system mandated by the No Child Left Behind Act of 2001 which requires each state to ensure that all schools and districts make Adequate Yearly Progress". Since ESEA was passed, states and schools across the country have been working to improve its academics standards and assessments to ensure students graduate with the knowledge and skills most demanded by college and careers. As a result of NCLB, all 50 states and the District of Columbia have created state standardized tests for all children that are mandatory for graduation from high school. These tests are known as "high-stakes testing" in which schools, administrators, and teachers all become accountable for the test scores of their students.

=== Changes ===
In 2015, the PARCC consortium reevaluated their assessment program based on feedback from the community of schools, educators, and other consortium members. "After a deep evaluation of the assessment system, PARCC adjusted the requirements to include one summative assessment (SA) to be completed towards the end of the year," a change implemented for the 2015–16 school year.

== Assessment ==
The PARCC assessments cover two courses – English language arts/literacy and mathematics – for students between Grade 3 and Grade 11. These exams are intended to be used as indicators of student needs and progress for teachers to identify and address.

PARCC has also developed a resource library called the Partnership Resource Center, which provides both teachers and parents with access to "computer-adaptive text complexity diagnostic tools". This initiative is designed to ensure students have access to appropriate-level texts and are prepared to enter college and careers at the right level.

The PARCC assessment is in the process of transitioning to a completely computer-based assessment system, and in the second year of assessments (2015–16), the vast majority of students who took the tests did so on a computer. The assessment platform of choice is TestNav provided by Pearson and the TAO Open Source platform has been chosen for non-summative assessment portions.

When administering the PARCC assessment, states will be able to tailor the exams to their standards, classes, and other accountability tools that are unique to each state.

== Membership ==
In the spring of 2010, the District of Columbia decided to join what was, at the time, a group of 24 PARCC states, which included: Alabama, Arizona, Arkansas, Delaware, Florida, Georgia, Illinois, Indiana, Kentucky, Louisiana, Maryland, Massachusetts, Mississippi, New Jersey, New Mexico, New York, North Dakota, Ohio, Oklahoma, Pennsylvania, Rhode Island, and Tennessee.

On September 23, 2013, Florida withdrew from Common Core and PARCC, citing unconstitutional involvement by the federal government in states' affairs.

In July 2013, a more accurate price estimation was made at $29.50 per student, higher than expected. Oklahoma, Pennsylvania, North Dakota, Alabama, Georgia, and Indiana have each filed the appropriate documentation to withdraw from the PARCC consortium as a result of the increased cost and rising public concern about the Common Core Standards.

As of March 25, 2014, only 14 states plus the District of Columbia remained in the PARCC consortium. States that had withdrawn included: Alabama, Colorado, Delaware, Florida, Georgia, Indiana, Kentucky, North Dakota, Pennsylvania, Tennessee, and Utah.

On January 16, 2015, Mississippi's state government voted to withdraw from PARCC.

On June 30, 2015, Ohio Governor John Kasich, along with the Ohio House and Senate, agreed to drop the PARCC Mathematics and English assessments after its first year of implementation. PARCC tests were not administered in Ohio during the 2015–2016 school year.

On July 12, 2016, the Illinois State Board of Education voted to continue giving the PARCC test to students grades 3–8, while high school students will take the SAT instead of PARCC.

In March 2024, the three active PARCC members were the District of Columbia (hybrid, and grades 3-10 only), Louisiana (hybrid, and grades 3-8 only), and Massachusetts (hybrid, and grades 3-10 only). PARCC assessments are also used by the federal Bureau of Indian Education, and the Department of Defense Education Activity.

Beginning in the 2023–2024 school year, the District of Columbia left the PARCC consortium and started their own assessment, DC CAPE.

=== Test Participation by States ===
State	Participation Status
~~Alabama~~	dropped February, 2013
~~Arizona~~	dropped May, 2014
~~Arkansas~~	dropped July, 2015
~~Florida~~	dropped September 2013
~~District of Columbia~~	dropped April 2024
DoDEA	current user
~~Georgia~~	dropped July, 2013
~~Illinois~~	dropped March 2019
~~Indiana~~	dropped June 2014
~~Kentucky~~	dropped January, 2014
Louisiana	uses hybrid PARCC/state test
~~Maryland~~	dropped September, 2018
Massachusetts	uses hybrid PARCC/state test
~~Mississippi~~	dropped January, 2015
~~New Jersey~~	dropped February, 2019
~~New Mexico~~	dropped January, 2019
~~North Dakota~~	dropped July, 2013
~~Ohio~~	dropped June 2015
~~Oklahoma~~	dropped July 2013
~~Pennsylvania~~	dropped March 2014
~~Rhode Island~~	dropped April 2017
~~Tennessee~~	dropped June, 2014
