= George F. Simmons =

American mathematician (1925–2019)

George Finlay Simmons (March 3, 1925 – August 6, 2019) was an American mathematician who worked in topology and classical analysis. He is known as the author of widely used textbooks on university mathematics.

== Life ==
He was born on 3 March 1925 in Austin, Texas.

He received his BS degree from California Institute of Technology in 1946. He received his MS degree from University of Chicago in 1948. After finishing his PhD from Yale University in 1957, he joined Colorado College as a lecturer.

From 1957 to his death in 2019, he taught at a number of universities, which include Williams College, the University of Rhode Island, Yale University, the University of Maine, and the University of Chicago.

== Quotes ==
In the algebra introduction of his book Precalculus Mathematics in a Nutshell, Professor George F. Simmons wrote that the New Math produced students who had "heard of the commutative law, but did not know the multiplication table."

== Selected publications ==
Some of his books are:

- Introduction to Topology and Modern Analysis (1963)
- Differential Equations with Applications and Historical Notes (1972, 1991, 2016)
- Precalculus Mathematics in a Nutshell (1981)
- Calculus with Analytic Geometry (1985, 1996)
- Calculus Gems: Brief Lives and Memorable Mathematics (1992)
