= Los Angeles Science Teachers Network =

Professional development network for science education

Los Angeles Science Teachers Network is a professional development network for science education by science teachers for science teachers committed to creating the most engaging hands-on curriculum possible through inquiry-based learning and scientific literacy.

== History ==
The first meeting was held in Lisa Ellen Niver's home in September 2009. In October 2013, the professional development network had its fifteenth session. Over seventy teachers and forty schools have been involved to date. In Westside Today, information about teaching, science and LASTN was presented. In the Bill & Melinda Gates Foundation Impatient Optimists article, "Teachers Need A Village," the importance of teachers needing support from groups like LASTN is explored. "Why So Many Of America's Teachers Are Leaving The Profession?" cites Los Angeles Science Teachers Network as an example to teachers everywhere to find support and stay involved.

== Advisory Council ==
Several teachers formed the core group and served as advisors to Niver over the first three years: Susan Bagdasarian, Sasha Moore, Joseph Rose and Judy Weiskopf. Niver was frequently asked about teaching science, she has been quoted in Parenting.com, PBS.org, Green Living Arizona (in print), the Huffington Post and on National television. While Niver is on sabbatical with We Said Go Travel, Susan Bagdasarian has been the director of the network.

== List of Participating Schools ==
- Adat Ari El
- Animo High School
- Berkeley Hall
- Brawerman School
- Brentwood School
- Buckley School
- Calvary Christian School
- Campbell Hall
- Carlthorp
- Center for Early Education
- Chadwick School
- cosee-west
- Crossroads School
- Curtis School
- Destination Science
- Echo Horizon
- Hillel Hebrew
- John Thomas Dye School
- Laurence School
- Maimonides
- Mirman School
- New Roads School
- Oakwood School
- Poly Tech
- PS 1
- Saint Marks
- Seven Arrows
- Sinai Akiba
- St James School
- St Matthews Parish School
- Stephen S Wise Temple Elementary School
- Temple Israel
- Turning Point School
- Valley Beth Shalom
- Viewpoint School
- Village School
- Westerly School
- Westside Neighborhood School
- Wildwood School
- Willows
- Windward School
- Yavneh

== See also ==
- Constructivism in science education
- National Science Education Standards
- National Science Teachers Association
- Science, Technology, Society and Environment Education
- School science technicians
- STEM fields
- Steve Spangler
