= Science education =

Teaching and learning of science to non-scientists within the general public

Science education is the teaching and learning of science to school children, college students, or adults within the general public. The field of science education includes work in science content, science process (the scientific method), some social science, and some teaching pedagogy.

The standards for science education provide expectations for the development of understanding for students through the entire course of their K-12 education and beyond. The traditional subjects included in the standards are physical, life, earth, space, and human sciences.

== Historical background ==
The first person credited with being employed as a science teacher in a British public school was William Sharp, who left the job at Rugby School in 1850 after establishing science to the curriculum. Sharp is said to have established a model for science to be taught throughout the British public school system.

The British Association for the Advancement of Science (BAAS) published a report in 1867 calling for the teaching of "pure science" and training of the "scientific habit of mind." The progressive education movement supported the ideology of mental training through the sciences. BAAS emphasized separate pre-professional training in secondary science education. In this way, future BAAS members could be prepared.

The initial development of science teaching was slowed by the lack of qualified teachers. One key development was the founding of the first London School Board in 1870, which discussed the school curriculum; another was the initiation of courses to supply the country with trained science teachers. In both cases the influence of Thomas Henry Huxley. John Tyndall was also influential in the teaching of physical science.

In the United States, science education was a scatter of subjects prior to its standardization in the 1890s. The development of a science curriculum emerged gradually after extended debate between two ideologies, citizen science and pre-professional training. As a result of a conference of thirty leading secondary and college educators in Florida, the National Education Association appointed a Committee of Ten in 1892, which had authority to organize future meetings and appoint subject matter committees of the major subjects taught in secondary schools. The committee was composed of ten educators and chaired by Charles Eliot of Harvard University. The Committee of Ten appointed nine conferences committees: Latin; Greek; English; Other Modern Languages; Mathematics; History; Civil Government and Political Economy; physics, astronomy, and chemistry; natural history; and geography. Each committee was composed of ten leading specialists from colleges, normal schools, and secondary schools. Committee reports were submitted to the Committee of Ten, which met for four days in New York City, to create a comprehensive report. In 1894, the NEA published the results of the work of these conference committees.

According to the Committee of Ten, the goal of high school was to prepare all students to do well in life, contributing to their well-being and the good of society. Another goal was to prepare some students to succeed in college.

This committee supported the citizen science approach focused on mental training and withheld performance in science studies from consideration for college entrance. The BAAS encouraged their longer standing model in the UK. The US adopted a curriculum was characterized as follows:

- Elementary science should focus on simple natural phenomena (nature study) by means of experiments carried out "in-the-field."
- Secondary science should focus on laboratory work and the committee's prepared lists of specific experiments
- Teaching of facts and principles
- College preparation

The format of shared mental training and pre-professional training consistently dominated the curriculum from its inception to now. However, the movement to incorporate a humanistic approach, such as inclusion of the arts (S.T.E.A.M.), science, technology, society and environment education is growing and being implemented more broadly in the late 20th century. Reports by the American Academy for the Advancement of Science (AAAS), including Project 2061, and by the National Committee on Science Education Standards and Assessment detail goals for science education that link classroom science to practical applications and societal implications.

== Fields of science education ==
Science is a universal subject that spans the branch of knowledge that examines the structure and behavior of the physical and natural world through observation and experiment. Science education is most commonly broken down into the following three fields: Biology, chemistry, and physics. Additionally, there is a large body of scientific literature that advocates the inclusion of teaching the Nature of Science, which is slowly being adopted into the national curricula.

=== Physics education ===
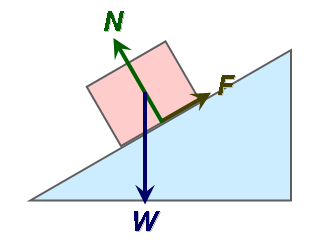
Demonstrates a free body

Physics education is characterized by the study of science that deals with matter and energy, and their interactions.

Physics First, a program endorsed by the American Association of Physics Teachers, is a curriculum in which 9th grade students take an introductory physics course. The purpose is to enrich students' understanding of physics, and allow for more detail to be taught in subsequent high school biology and chemistry classes. It also aims to increase the number of students who go on to take 12th grade physics or AP Physics, which are generally elective courses in American high schools

Physics education in high schools in the United States has suffered the last twenty years because many states now only require three sciences, which can be satisfied by earth/physical science, chemistry, and biology. The fact that many students do not take physics in high school makes it more difficult for those students to take scientific courses in college.

At the university/college level, using appropriate technology-related projects to spark non-physics majors' interest in learning physics has been shown to be successful. This is a potential opportunity to forge the connection between physics and social benefit.

=== Chemistry education ===
Chemistry education is characterized by the study of science that deals with the composition, structure, and properties of substances and the transformations that they undergo.

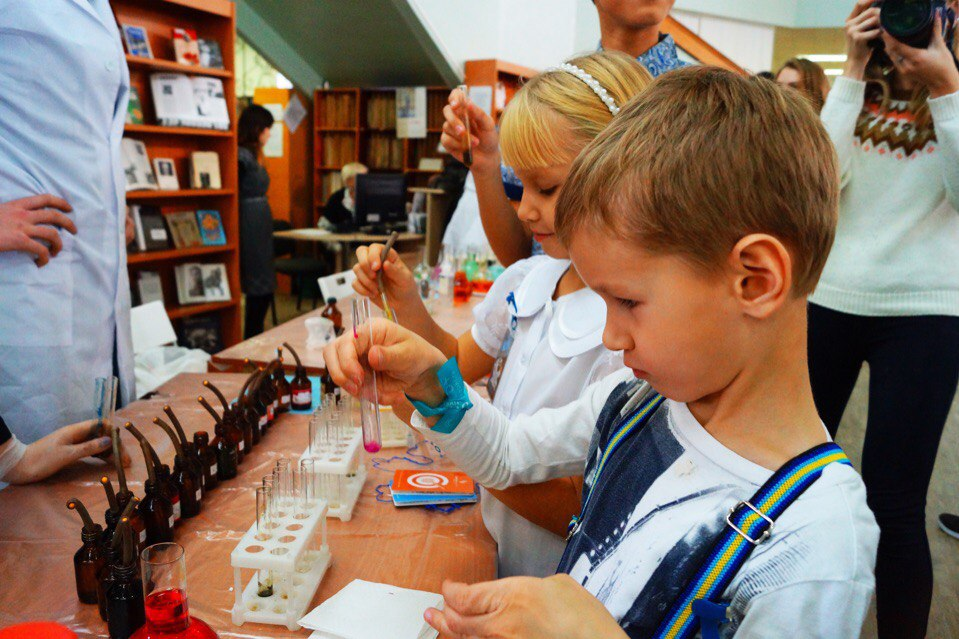
Children mix different chemicals in test tubes as part of a science education program.

Chemistry is the study of chemicals and the elements and their effects and attributes. Students in chemistry learn the periodic table. The branch of science education known as "chemistry must be taught in a relevant context in order to promote full understanding of current sustainability issues." As this source states chemistry is a very important subject in school as it teaches students to understand issues in the world. As children are interested by the world around them chemistry teachers can attract interest in turn educating the students further. The subject of chemistry is a very practical based subject meaning most of class time is spent working or completing experiments.

=== Biology education ===
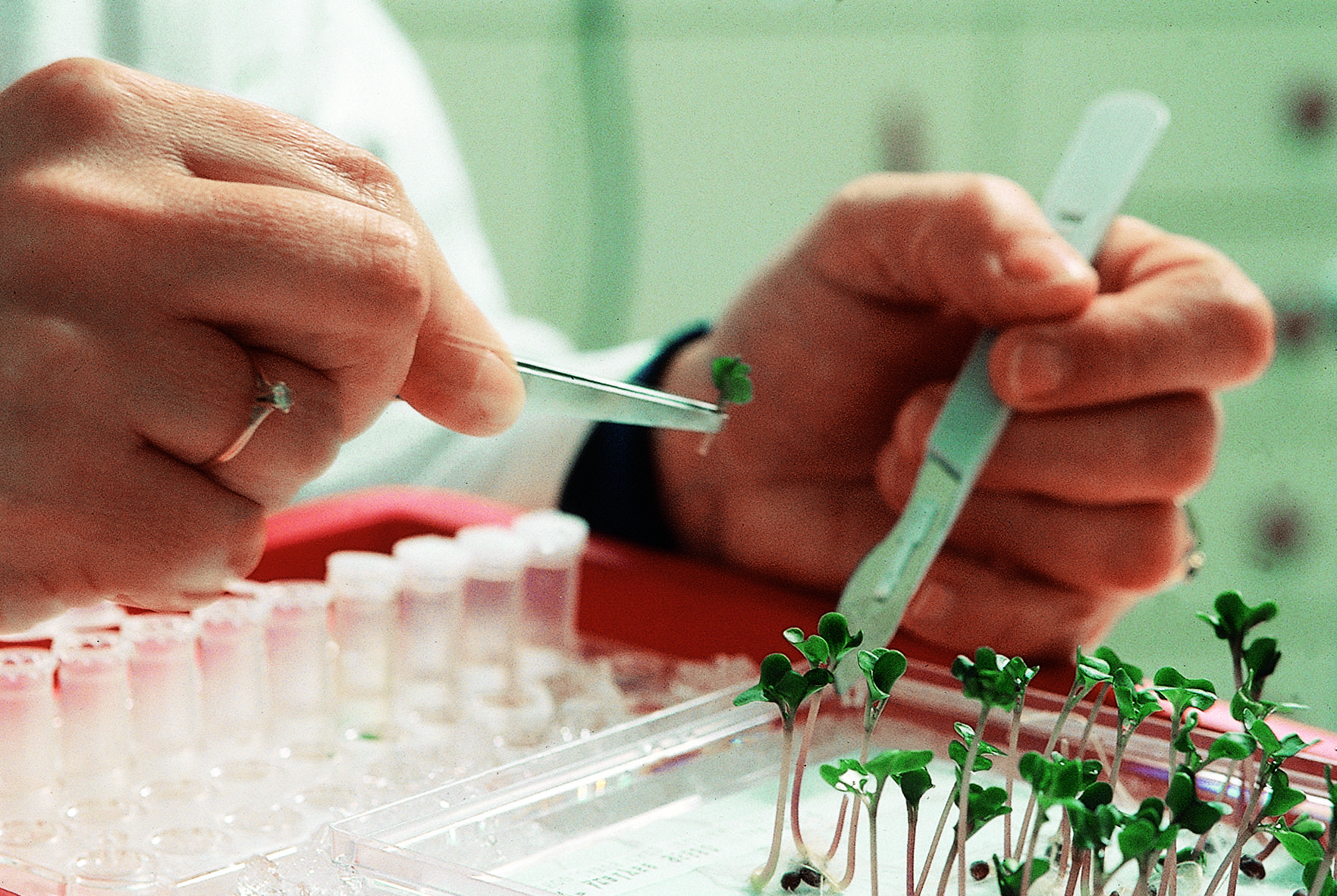
Picture of a biology lab taking place

Biology education is characterized by the study of structure, function, heredity, and evolution of all living organisms. Biology itself is the study of living organisms, through different fields including morphology, physiology, anatomy, behavior, origin, and distribution.

Depending on the country and education level, there are many approaches to teaching biology. In the United States, there is a growing emphasis on the ability to investigate and analyze biology related questions over an extended period of time. Current biological education standards are based on decisions made by the Committee of Ten, who aimed to standardize pre-college learning in 1892. The Committee emphasized the importance of learning natural history (biology) first, focusing on observation through laboratory work.

=== Nature of Science education ===
Nature of Science education refers to the study of how science is a human initiative, how it interacts with society, what scientists do, how scientific knowledge is built up and exchanged, how it evolves, how it is used. It stresses the empirical nature and the different methods used in science. The goals of Nature of Science education are stated to be to help students evaluate scientific and pseudo scientific statements, to motivate them to study science and to better prepare them for a career in science or in a field that interacts with science.

== Pedagogy ==
While the public image of science education may be one of simply learning facts by rote, science education in recent history also generally concentrates on the teaching of science concepts and addressing misconceptions that learners may hold regarding science concepts or other content. Thomas Kuhn, whose 1962 book The Structure of Scientific Revolutions greatly influenced the post-positivist philosophy of science, argued that the traditional method of teaching in the natural sciences tends to produce a rigid mindset.

Since the 1980s, science education has been strongly influenced by constructivist thinking. Constructivism in science education has been informed by an extensive research programme into student thinking and learning in science, and in particular exploring how teachers can facilitate conceptual change towards canonical scientific thinking. Constructivism emphasises the active role of the learner, and the significance of current knowledge and understanding in mediating learning, and the importance of teaching that provides an optimal level of guidance to learners.

According to a 2004 Policy Forum in Science magazine, "scientific teaching involves active learning strategies to engage students in the process of science and teaching methods that have been systematically tested and shown to reach diverse students."

The 2007 volume Scientific Teaching lists three major tenets of scientific teaching:

- Active learning: A process in which students are actively engaged in learning. It may include inquiry-based learning, cooperative learning, or student-centered learning.
- Assessment: Tools for measuring progress toward and achievement of the learning goals.
- Diversity: The breadth of differences that make each student unique, each cohort of students unique, and each teaching experience unique. Diversity includes everything in the classroom: the students, the instructors, the content, the teaching methods, and the context.

These elements should underlie educational and pedagogical decisions in the classroom. The "SCALE-UP" learning environment is an example of applying the scientific teaching approach. In practice, scientific teaching employs a "backward design" approach. The instructor first decides what the students should know and be able to do (learning goals), then determines what would be evidence of student achievement of the learning goals, then designs assessments to measure this achievement. Finally, the instructor plans the learning activities, which should facilitate student learning through scientific discovery.

=== Science pedagogical approaches ===
A number of pedagogical approaches are important in modern science teaching, each of which come from distinct philosophical backgrounds and involve different classroom strategies. These include teacher-centred pedagogy, which is a traditional behaviourist approach, where the teacher is the main source of knowledge and directs learning. However, other more constructivist approaches are today often favored which are more learner centred. Pure discovery is where students are autonomous and teachers have a minimal role. However, more favoured is a learner guided approach, where the educator guides and facilitates learning. Specific hands-on illustrations of this approach are available. Another form is inquiry based learning, where the student takes on the role of the investigator with often the educator providing initial questions to examine. In practical and experiential science the emphasis is on practical hands-one experimentation, with students performing experiments themselves. Often a blend of the above methods are used depending on context and lesson.

== Research ==
The practice of science education has been increasingly informed by research into science teaching and learning. Research in science education relies on a wide variety of methodologies, borrowed from many branches of science and engineering such as computer science, cognitive science, cognitive psychology and anthropology. Science education research aims to define or characterize what constitutes learning in science and how it is brought about.

John D. Bransford, et al., summarized massive research into student thinking as having three key findings:

Preconceptions
Prior ideas about how things work are remarkably tenacious and an educator must explicitly address a student's specific misconceptions if the student is to reconfigure his misconception in favour of another explanation. Therefore, it is essential that educators know how to learn about student preconceptions and make this a regular part of their planning.
Knowledge organization
In order to become truly literate in an area of science, students must, "(a) have a deep foundation of factual knowledge, (b) understand facts and ideas in the context of a conceptual framework, and (c) organize knowledge in ways that facilitate retrieval and application."
Metacognition
Students will benefit from thinking about their thinking and their learning. They must be taught ways of evaluating their knowledge and what they do not know, evaluating their methods of thinking, and evaluating their conclusions. Some educators and others have practiced and advocated for discussions of pseudoscience as a way to understand what it is to think scientifically and to address the problems introduced by pseudoscience.

Educational technologies are being refined to meet the specific needs of science teachers. One research study examining how cellphones are being used in post-secondary science teaching settings showed that mobile technologies can increase student engagement and motivation in the science classroom.

According to a bibliography on constructivist-oriented research on teaching and learning science in 2005, about 64 percent of studies documented are carried out in the domain of physics, 21 percent in the domain of biology, and 15 percent in chemistry. The major reason for this dominance of physics in the research on teaching and learning appears to be that understanding physics includes difficulties due to the particular nature of physics. Research on students' conceptions has shown that most pre-instructional (everyday) ideas that students bring to physics instruction are in stark contrast to the physics concepts and principles to be achieved – from kindergarten to the tertiary level. Quite often students' ideas are incompatible with physics views. This also holds true for students' more general patterns of thinking and reasoning.

== By country ==
=== Australia ===
As in England and Wales, science education in Australia is compulsory up until year 11, where students can choose to study one or more of the branches mentioned above. If they wish to no longer study science, they can choose none of the branches. The science stream is one course up until year 11, meaning students learn in all of the branches giving them a broad idea of what science is all about. The National Curriculum Board of Australia (2009) stated that "The science curriculum will be organised around three interrelated strands: science understanding; science inquiry skills; and science as a human endeavour." These strands give teachers and educators the framework of how they should be instructing their students.

In 2007, it was reported that a major problem that had befallen science education in Australia over the decade was a falling interest in science. Fewer year 10 students were choosing to study science for year 11, which is problematic as these are the years where students form attitudes to pursue science careers. This issue was not unique in Australia, but was happening in countries all over the world.

=== China ===
Educational quality in China suffers because a typical classroom contains 50 to 70 students. With over 200 million students, China has the largest educational system in the world. However, only 20% percent of students complete the rigorous ten-year program of formal schooling.

As in many other countries, the science curriculum includes sequenced courses in physics, chemistry, and biology. Science education is given high priority and is driven by textbooks composed by committees of scientists and teachers. Science education in China places great emphasis on memorization, and gives far less attention to problem solving, application of principles to novel situations, interpretations, and predictions.

=== United Kingdom ===
In English and Welsh schools, science is a compulsory subject in the National Curriculum. All pupils from 5 to 16 years of age must study science. It is generally taught as a single subject science until sixth form, then splits into subject-specific A levels (physics, chemistry and biology). However, the government has since expressed its desire that those pupils who achieve well at the age of 14 should be offered the opportunity to study the three separate sciences from September 2008. In Scotland the subjects split into chemistry, physics and biology at the age of 13–15 for National 4/5s in these subjects, and there is also a combined science standard grade qualification which students can sit, provided their school offers it.

In September 2006 a new science program of study known as 21st Century Science was introduced as a GCSE option in UK schools, designed to "give all 14 to 16-year-old's a worthwhile and inspiring experience of science". In November 2013, Ofsted's survey of science in schools revealed that practical science teaching was not considered important enough. At the majority of English schools, students have the opportunity to study a separate science program as part of their GCSEs, which results in them taking 6 papers at the end of Year 11; this usually fills one of their option 'blocks' and requires more science lessons than those who choose not to partake in separate science or are not invited. Other students who choose not to follow the compulsory additional science course, which results in them taking 4 papers resulting in 2 GCSEs, opposed to the 3 GCSEs given by taking separate science.

=== United States ===
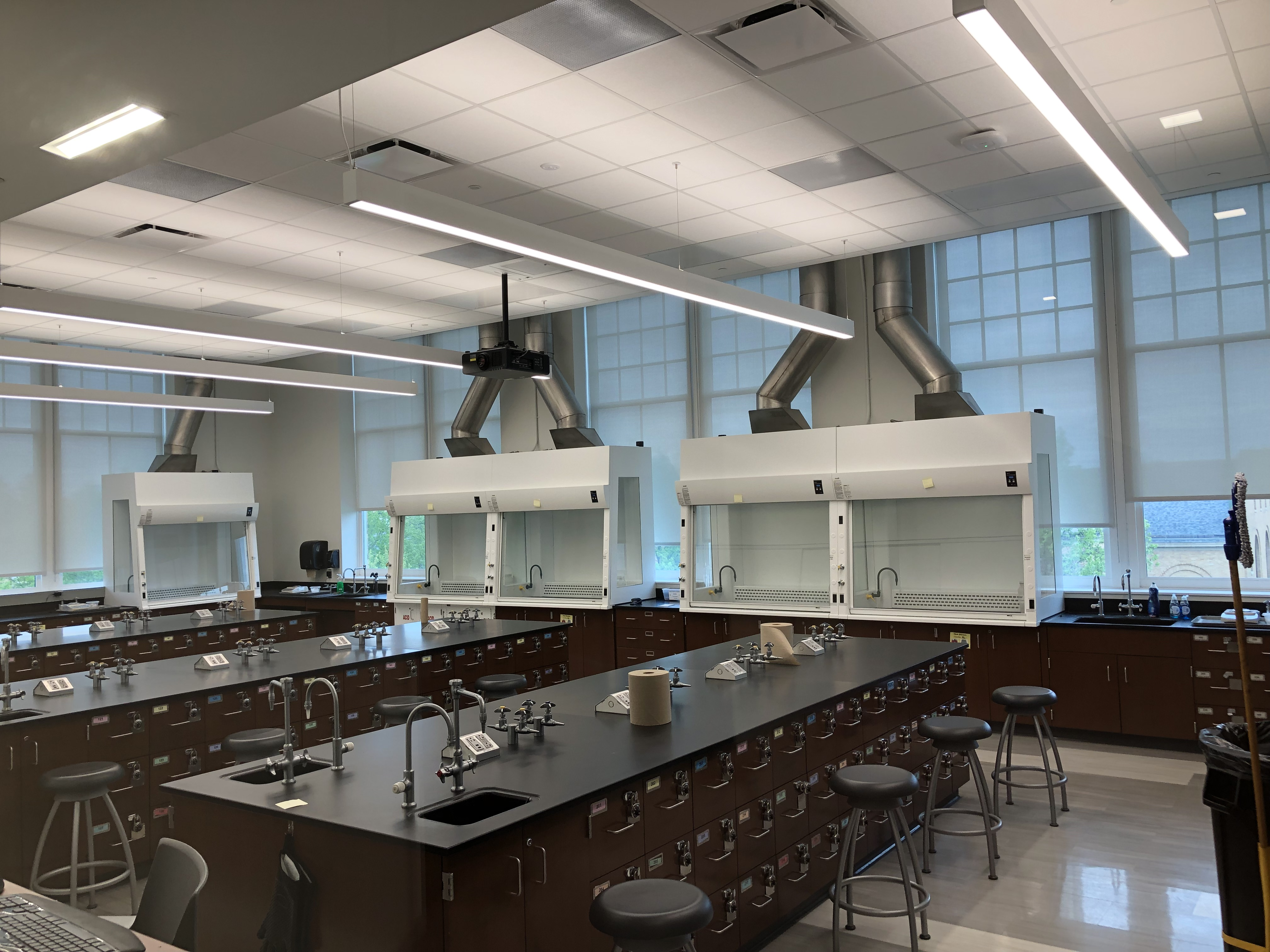
A university chemistry lab in the United States

In many U.S. states, K-12 educators must adhere to rigid standards or frameworks of what content is to be taught to which age groups. This often leads teachers to rush to "cover" the material, without truly "teaching" it. In addition, the process of science, including such elements as the scientific method and critical thinking, is often overlooked. This emphasis can produce students who pass standardized tests without having developed complex problem solving skills. Although at the college level American science education tends to be less regulated, it is actually more rigorous, with teachers and professors fitting more content into the same time period.

In 1996, the U.S. National Academy of Sciences of the U.S. National Academies produced the National Science Education Standards, which is available online for free in multiple forms. Its focus on inquiry-based science, based on the theory of constructivism rather than on direct instruction of facts and methods, remains controversial. Some research suggests that it is more effective as a model for teaching science.

"The Standards call for more than 'science as process,' in which students learn such skills as observing, inferring, and experimenting. Inquiry is central to science learning. When engaging in inquiry, students describe objects and events, ask questions, construct explanations, test those explanations against current scientific knowledge, and communicate their ideas to others. They identify their assumptions, use critical and logical thinking, and consider alternative explanations. In this way, students actively develop their understanding of science by combining scientific knowledge with reasoning and thinking skills."

Concern about science education and science standards has often been driven by worries that American students, and even teachers, lag behind their peers in international rankings. One notable example was the wave of education reforms implemented after the Soviet Union launched its Sputnik satellite in 1957. The first and most prominent of these reforms was led by the Physical Science Study Committee at MIT. In recent years, business leaders such as Microsoft Chairman Bill Gates have called for more emphasis on science education, saying the United States risks losing its economic edge. Public opinion surveys, however, indicate most U.S. parents are complacent about science education and that their level of concern has actually declined in recent years.

Furthermore, in the recent National Curriculum Survey conducted by ACT, researchers uncovered a possible disconnect among science educators. "Both middle school/junior high school teachers and post secondary science instructors rate(d) process/inquiry skills as more important than advanced science content topics; high school teachers rate them in exactly the opposite order." Perhaps more communication among educators at the different grade levels is necessary to ensure common goals for students.

==== 2012 science education framework ====
According to a report from the National Academy of Sciences, the fields of science, technology, and education hold a paramount place in the modern world, but there are not enough workers in the United States entering the science, technology, engineering, and math (STEM) professions. In 2012 the National Academy of Sciences Committee on a Conceptual Framework for New K-12 Science Education Standards developed a guiding framework to standardize K-12 science education with the goal of organizing science education systematically across the K-12 years. Titled A Framework for K-12 Science Education: Practices, Crosscutting Concepts, and Core Ideas, the publication promotes standardizing K-12 science education in the United States. It emphasizes science educators to focus on a "limited number of disciplinary core ideas and crosscutting concepts, be designed so that students continually build on and revise their knowledge and abilities over multiple years, and support the integration of such knowledge and abilities with the practices needed to engage in scientific inquiry and engineering design."

The report says that in the 21st century Americans need science education in order to engage in and "systematically investigate issues related to their personal and community priorities," as well as to reason scientifically and know how to apply science knowledge. The committee that designed this new framework sees this imperative as a matter of educational equity to the diverse set of schoolchildren. Getting more diverse students into STEM education is a matter of social justice as seen by the committee.

==== 2013 Next Generation Science Standards ====
In 2013 new standards for science education were released that update the national standards released in 1996. Developed by 26 state governments and national organizations of scientists and science teachers, the guidelines, called the Next Generation Science Standards, are intended to "combat widespread scientific ignorance, to standardize teaching among states, and to raise the number of high school graduates who choose scientific and technical majors in college...." Included are guidelines for teaching students about topics such as climate change and evolution. An emphasis is teaching the scientific process so that students have a better understanding of the methods of science and can critically evaluate scientific evidence. Organizations that contributed to developing the standards include the National Science Teachers Association, the American Association for the Advancement of Science, the National Research Council, and Achieve, a nonprofit organization that was also involved in developing math and English standards.

==== Next Generation Science Standards ====
Science education curriculum in the United States is outlined by the Next Generation Science Standards (NGSS) which were released in April 2013. The purpose of the NGSS is to establish a standardized Kindergarten to 12th Grade science curriculum. These standards were instituted in hopes that they would reform the past science education system and foster higher student achievement through improved curriculum and teacher development. The Next Generation Science Standards are made up of three components listed as follows: disciplinary core ideas, science and engineering practices, and crosscutting concepts. These are referred to as the three dimensions of the Next Generation Science Standards. Within these standards, there is emphasis on alignment with K-12 Common Core state standards. The dimension entitled "science and engineering practices" focuses on students' learning of the scientific method. This means that this dimension centers around practicing science in a hands-on manner, giving students the opportunity to observe scientific processes, hypothesize, and observe results. This dimension highlights the empirical methods of science. The dimension entitled "crosscutting concepts" emphasizes the understanding of key themes within the field of science. The "crosscutting concepts" are themes that are consistently relevant throughout many different scientific disciplines, such as the flow of energy/matter, cause/effect, systems/system practices, patterns, the relationship between structure and function, and stability/change. The purpose of outlining these key themes relates to generalized learning, meaning that the effectiveness of these themes could lie in the fact that these concepts are important throughout all of the scientific disciplines. The intention is that by learning them, students will create a broad understanding of science. The dimension entitled "disciplinary core ideas" outlines a set of key ideas for each scientific field. For example, physical science has a certain set of core ideas laid out by the framework.

==== Science Education and Common Core ====
Common Core education standards emphasize reading, writing, and communication skills. The purpose of these standards for English and Mathematics was to create measurable goals for student learning that are aligned with the standards in place in other nations, such that students in the United States become prepared to succeed at a global level. It is meant to set standards for academics that are rigorous in nature and prepare students for higher education. It is also outlined that students with disabilities must be properly accommodated for under Common Core standards via an Individualized Education Plan (IEP). Under these standards, the comprehension of scientific writing has become an important skill for students to learn through textbooks.

==== Science Education Strategies ====
Evidence suggests, however, that students learn science more effectively under hands-on, activity and inquiry based learning, rather than learning from a textbook. It has been seen that students, in particular those with learning disabilities, perform better on unit tests after learning science through activities, rather than textbook-based learning. Thus, it is argued that science is better learned through experiential activities. Additionally, it has reported that students, specifically those with learning disabilities, prefer and feel that they learn more effectively through activity-based learning. Information like this can help inform the way science is taught and how it can be taught most effectively for students of all abilities. The laboratory is a foundational example of hands-on, activity-based learning. In the laboratory, students use materials to observe scientific concepts and phenomena. The laboratory in science education can include multiple different phases. These phases include planning and design, performance, and analysis and interpretation. It is believed by many educators that laboratory work promotes their students' scientific thinking, problem solving skills, and cognitive development. Since 1960, instructional strategies for science education have taken into account Jean Piaget's developmental model, and therefore started introducing concrete materials and laboratory settings, which required students to actively participate in their learning.

In addition to the importance of the laboratory in learning and teaching science, there has been an increase in the importance of learning using computational tools. The use of computational tools, which have become extremely prevalent in STEM fields as a result of the advancement of technology, has been shown to support science learning. The learning of computational science in the classroom is becoming foundational to students' learning of modern science concepts. In fact, the Next Generation Science Standards specifically reference the use of computational tools and simulations. Through the use of computational tools, students participate in computational thinking, a cognitive process in which interacting with computational tools such as computers is a key aspect. As computational thinking becomes increasingly relevant in science, it becomes an increasingly important aspect of learning for science educators to act on.

Another strategy that may include both hands-on activities and using computational tools is creating authentic science learning experiences. Several perspectives of authentic science education have been suggested, including: canonical perspective - making science education as similar as possible to the way science is practiced in the real world; youth-centered - solving problems that are of interest to young students; contextual - a combination of the canonical and youth-centered perspectives. Although activities involving hands-on inquiry and computational tools may be authentic, some have contended that inquiry tasks commonly used in schools are not authentic enough, but often rely on simple "cookbook" experiments. Authentic science learning experiences can be implemented in various forms. For example: hand on inquiry, preferably involving an open ended investigation; student-teacher-scientist partnership (STSP) or citizen science projects; design-based learning (DBL); using web-based environments used by scientists (using bioinformatics tools like genes or proteins databases, alignment tools etc.), and; learning with adapted primary literature (APL), which exposes students also to the way the scientific community communicates knowledge. These examples and more can be applied to various domains of science taught in schools (as well as undergraduate education), and comply with the calls to include scientific practices in science curricula.

==== Informal science education ====
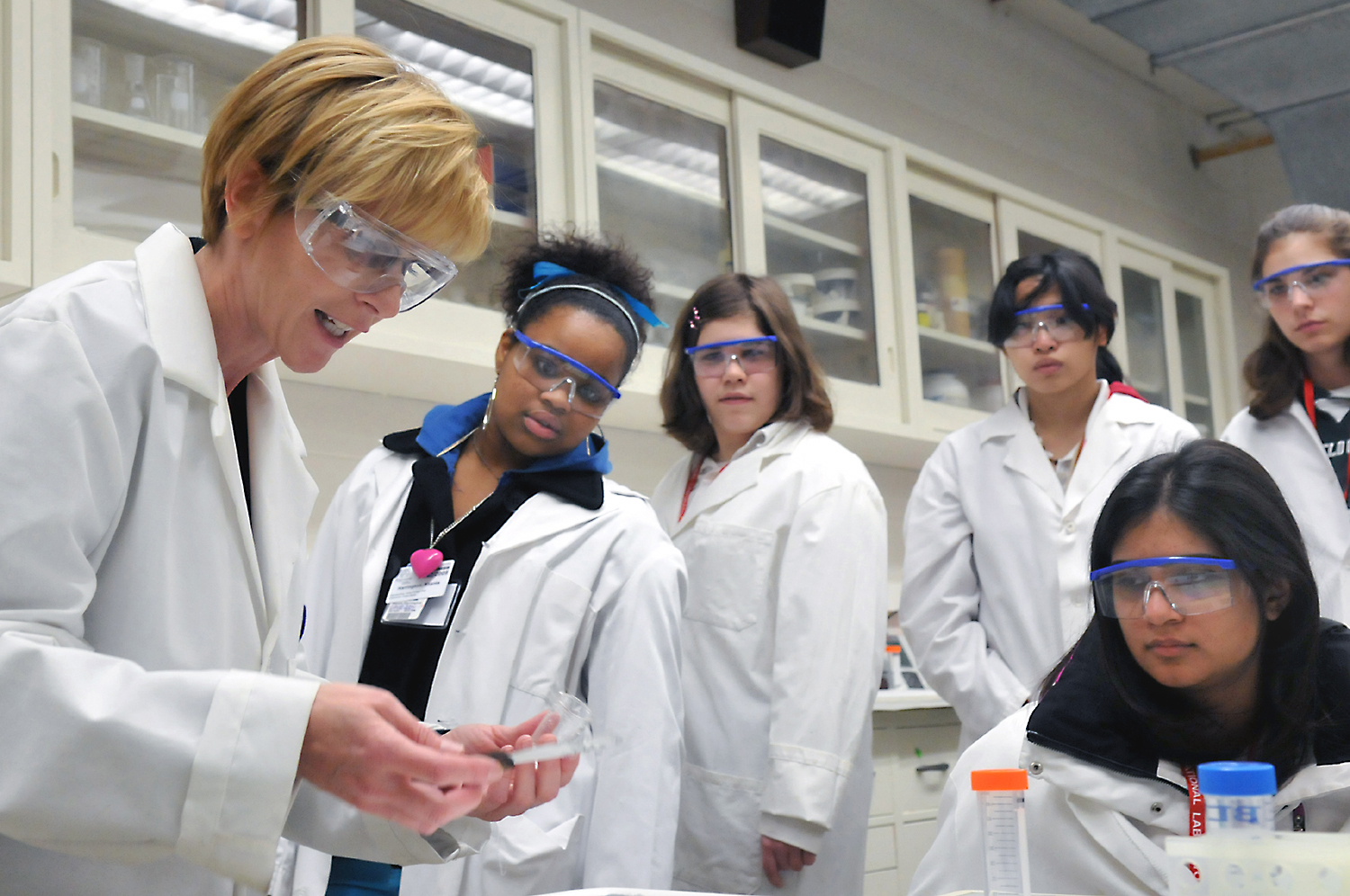
Young women participate in a conference at the Argonne National Laboratory.

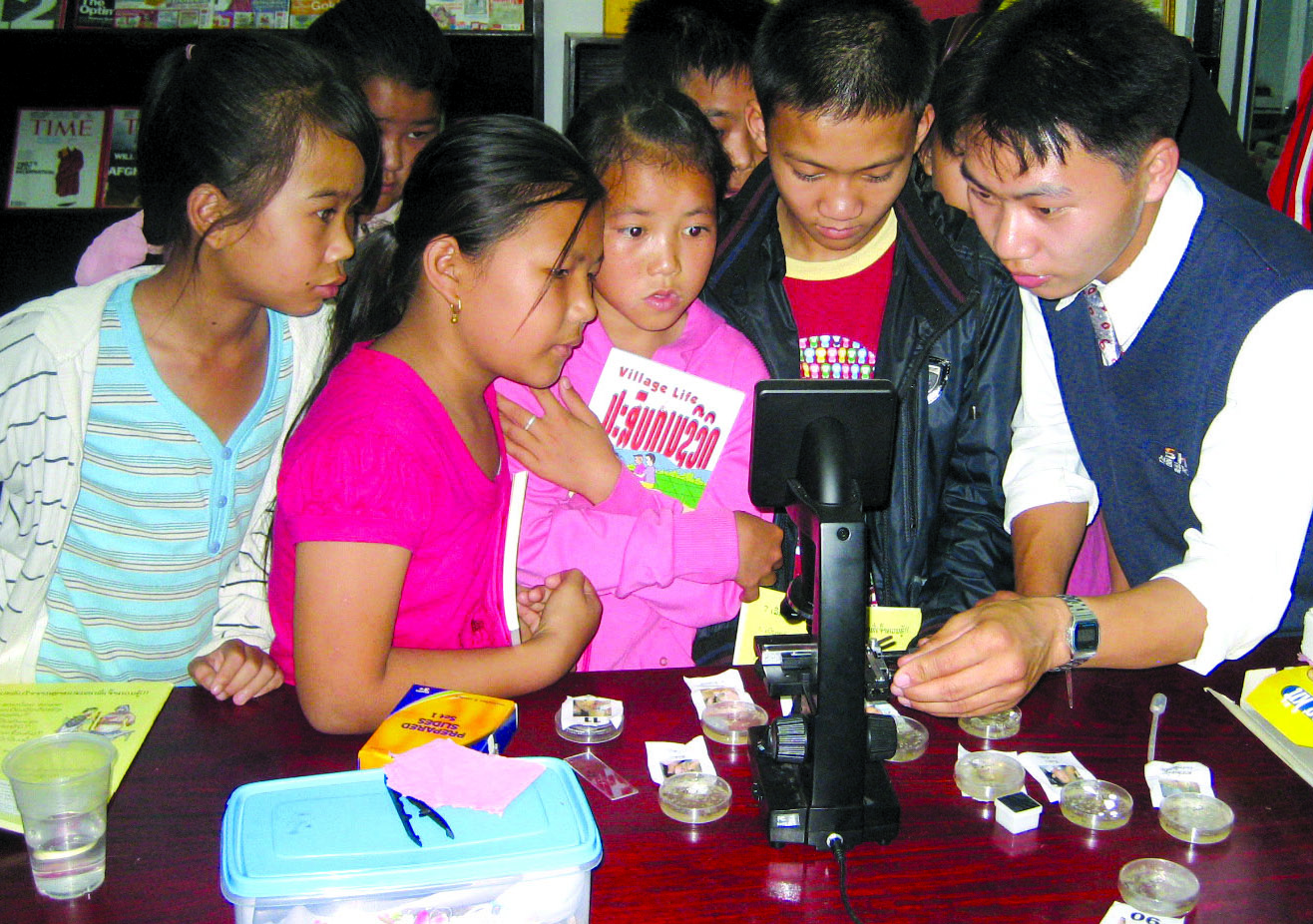
Young students use a microscope for the first time, as they examine bacteria a "Discovery Day" organized by Big Brother Mouse, a literacy and education project in Laos.

Informal science education is the science teaching and learning that occurs outside of the formal school curriculum in places such as museums, the media, and community-based programs. The National Science Teachers Association has created a position statement on Informal Science Education to define and encourage science learning in many contexts and throughout the lifespan. Research in informal science education is funded in the United States by the National Science Foundation. The Center for Advancement of Informal Science Education (CAISE) provides resources for the informal science education community.

Examples of informal science education include science centers, science museums, and new digital learning environments (e.g. Global Challenge Award), many of which are members of the Association of Science and Technology Centers (ASTC). The Franklin Institute in Philadelphia and the Museum of Science (Boston) are the oldest of this type of museum in the United States. Media include TV programs such as NOVA, Newton's Apple, "Bill Nye the Science Guy", "Beakman's World", The Magic School Bus, and Dragonfly TV. Early examples of science education on American television included programs by Daniel Q. Posin, such as "Dr. Posin's Universe", "The Universe Around Us", "On the Shoulders of Giants", and "Out of This World". Examples of community-based programs are 4-H Youth Development programs, Hands On Science Outreach, NASA and After school Programs and Girls at the Center. Home education is encouraged through educational products such as the former (1940–1989) Things of Science subscription service.

In 2010, the National Academies released Surrounded by Science: Learning Science in Informal Environments, based on the National Research Council study, Learning Science in Informal Environments: People, Places, and Pursuits. Surrounded by Science is a resource book that shows how current research on learning science across informal science settings can guide the thinking, the work, and the discussions among informal science practitioners. This book makes valuable research accessible to those working in informal science: educators, museum professionals, university faculty, youth leaders, media specialists, publishers, broadcast journalists, and many others.

== See also ==
- Center for Informal Learning and Schools
- chronolog - a citizen science environmental monitoring platform.
- Controversial science
- Constructivism in science education
- Discipline-based education research
- Discovery learning
- Educational research
- Environmental groups and resources serving K–12 schools
- Epistemology (the study of knowledge and how we know things)
- Graduate school
- Inquiry-based Science
- National Science Education Standards
- National Science Teachers Association
- Pedagogy
- Physics education
- Mathematics education
- Engineering education
- Public awareness of science
- School science technicians
- Science education in England
- Science, Technology, Society and Environment Education
- Scientific literacy
- Science outreach
- Scientific modelling
- Science education on YouTube
