= Wiley Bad Science Series =

Series of books by John Wiley & Sons Publishing

The Wiley Bad Science Series is a series of books by John Wiley & Sons Publishing about scientific misconceptions.

The Publishers Weekly review of the first book in the series, Bad Astronomy, mentioned that the subsequent books will be about scientific misconceptions in biology, weather and the earth.

- 2002: Bad Astronomy: Misconceptions and Misuses Revealed, from Astrology to the Moon Landing "Hoax", by Philip C. Plait
- 2003: Bad Medicine: Misconceptions and Misuses Revealed, from Distance Healing to Vitamin O, by Christopher Wanjek
