= Scientific misconceptions =

False beliefs about science

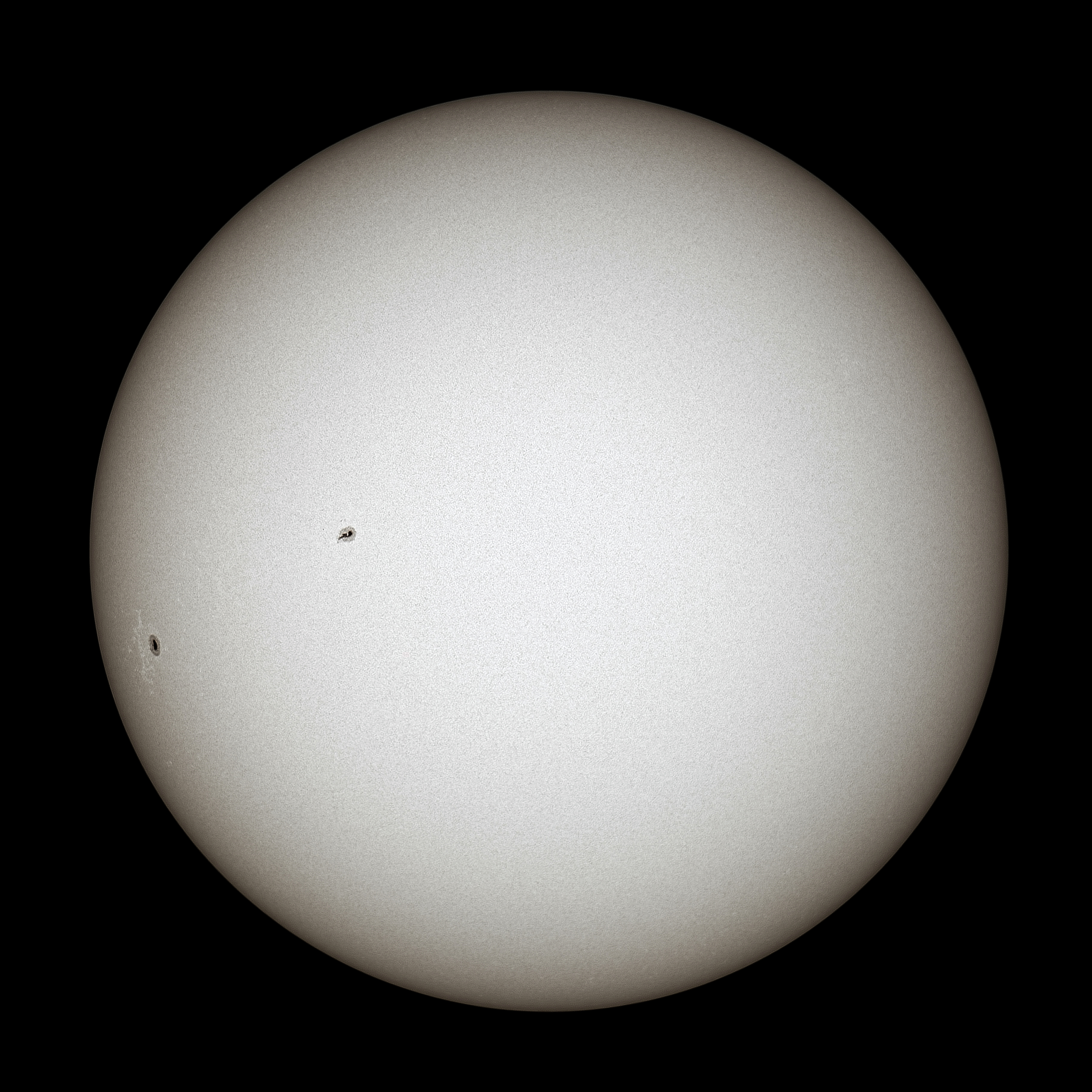
It is a popular misconception that the Sun is red, orange or yellow. In reality, the Sun is white as seen in this solar filter dimmed true-color image.

Scientific misconceptions are commonly held beliefs about science that have no basis in actual scientific fact. Scientific misconceptions can also refer to preconceived notions based on religious and/or cultural influences. Many scientific misconceptions occur because of faulty teaching styles and the sometimes distancing nature of true scientific texts. Because students' prior knowledge and misconceptions are important factors for learning science, science teachers should be able to identify and address these conceptions.

== Types ==
Misconceptions (a.k.a. alternative conceptions, alternative frameworks, etc.) are a key issue from constructivism in science education, a major theoretical perspective informing science teaching. A scientific misconception is a false or incorrect understanding of a scientific concept or principle, often resulting from oversimplifications, inaccurate information, or the misapplication of intuitive knowledge. Misconceptions can arise due to a variety of factors, such as personal experiences, cultural beliefs, or the way information is presented in educational settings. Addressing scientific misconceptions is crucial for developing a more accurate understanding of the natural world and improving scientific literacy. In general, scientific misconceptions have their foundations in a few "intuitive knowledge domains, including folkmechanics (object boundaries and movements), folkbiology (biological species' configurations and relationships), and folkpsychology (interactive agents and goal-directed behavior)", that enable humans to interact effectively with the world in which they evolved. That these folksciences do not map accurately onto modern scientific theory is not unexpected. A second major source of scientific misconceptions are educational misconceptions, which are induced and reinforced during the course of instruction (in formal education).

There has been extensive research into students' informal ideas about science topics, and studies have suggested reported misconceptions vary considerably in terms of properties such as coherence, stability, context-dependence, range of application etc. Misconceptions can be broken down into five basic categories:

1. preconceived notions
2. nonscientific beliefs
3. conceptual misunderstandings
4. vernacular misconceptions
5. factual misconceptions

Preconceived notions are thinking about a concept in only one way. Once a person knows how something works it is difficult to imagine it working a different way. Nonscientific beliefs are beliefs learned outside of scientific evidence. For example, one's beliefs about the history of world based on the bible. Conceptual misunderstandings are ideas about what one thinks they understand based on their personal experiences or what they may have heard. One does not fully grasp the concept and understand it. Vernacular misconceptions happen when one word has two completely different meanings, especially in regard to science and everyday life. Factual misconceptions are ideas or beliefs that are learned at a young age but are actually incorrect.

While most student misconceptions go unrecognized, there has been an informal effort to identify errors and misconceptions present in textbooks.

== Identifying student misconceptions ==
In the context of Socratic instruction, student misconceptions are identified and addressed through a process of questioning and listening. A number of strategies have been employed to understand what students are thinking prior, or in response, to instruction. These strategies include various forms of "real type" feedback, which can involve the use of colored cards or electronic survey systems (clickers). Another approach is typified by the strategy known as just-in-time teaching. Here students are asked various questions prior to class, the instructor uses these responses to adapt their teaching to the students' prior knowledge and misconceptions.

Finally, there is a more research-intensive approach that involves interviewing students for the purpose of generating the items that will make up a concept inventory or other forms of diagnostic instruments. Concept inventories require intensive validation efforts. Perhaps the most influential of these concept inventories to date has been the Force Concept Inventory (FCI). Concept inventories can be particularly helpful in identifying difficult ideas that serve as a barrier to effective instruction. Concept inventories in natural selection and basic biology have been developed.

While not all the published diagnostic instruments have been developed as carefully as some concept inventories, some two-tier diagnostic instruments (which offer multiple choice distractors informed by misconceptions research, and then ask learners to give reasons for their choices) have been through rigorous development. In identifying students' misconceptions, first teachers can identify their preconceptions. "Teachers need to know students' initial and developing conceptions. Students need to have their initial ideas brought to a conscious level." However, teachers' ability to diagnose misconceptions needs to be improved. When confronted with misconceptions about evolution, they only diagnose approximately half of these misconceptions. Thus, another approach for identifying misconceptions could be that not only teachers do it but the students themselves. With the help of lists with common misconceptions and examples, students can identify their own misconceptions and become metacognitively aware of these.

== Addressing student misconceptions ==
A number of lines of evidence suggest that the recognition and revision of student misconceptions involves active, rather than passive, involvement with the material. A common approach to instruction involves meta-cognition, that is to encourage students to think about their thinking about a particular problem. In part this approach requires students to verbalize, defend and reformulate their understanding. Recognizing the realities of the modern classroom, a number of variations have been introduced. These include Eric Mazur's peer instruction, as well as various tutorials in physics. Using a metacognitive approach, researchers have also found that making students metacognitively aware of their own intuitive conceptions through a self-assessment and supporting them in self-regulating their intuitive conceptions in scientific contexts enhances students' conceptual understanding. Scientific inquiry is another technique that provides an active engagement opportunity for students and incorporates metacognition and critical thinking.

Success with inquiry-based learning activities relies on a deep foundation of factual knowledge. Students then use observation, imagination, and reasoning about scientific phenomena they are studying to organize knowledge within a conceptual framework. The teacher monitors the changing concepts of the students through formative assessment as the instruction proceeds. Beginning inquiry activities should develop from simple concrete examples to more abstract. As students progress through inquiry, opportunities should be included for students to generate, ask, and discuss challenging questions. According to Magnusson and Palincsan, teachers should allow multiple cycles of investigation where students can ask the same questions as their understanding of the concept matures. Through strategies that apply formative assessment of student learning and adjust accordingly, teachers can help redirect scientific misconceptions. Research has shown that science teachers have a wide repertoire to deal with misconceptions and report a variety of ways to respond to students' alternative conceptions, e.g., attempting to induce a cognitive conflict using analogies, requesting an elaboration of the conception, referencing specific flaws in reasoning, or offering a parallel between the student's conception and a historical theory. However, approximately half of the teachers do not address students' misconceptions, but instead agree with them, respond scientifically incorrect, or formulate the correct scientific explanation themselves without addressing the specific student conception.

== See also ==
- List of common misconceptions – Common misconceptions, including scientific ones
- Superseded theories in science
- List of fallacies
- Wiley Bad Science Series of books:
  - Bad Astronomy: Misconceptions and Misuses Revealed, from Astrology to the Moon Landing "Hoax"
- Badastronomy.com blog
