= Bad Astronomy =

2002 book by Phil Plait

- Author: Philip C. Plait
- Subject: Astronomy -- Popular works. Astronomy -- Miscellanea. Errors, Scientific.
- Publisher: John Wiley & Sons
- Publication date: 1 March 2002
- Pages: 288
- ISBN: 978-0-471-40976-2
- OCLC: 48885221
- Followed by: Bad Medicine: Misconceptions and Misuses Revealed, from Distance Healing to Vitamin O (Wiley Bad Science Series)

Bad Astronomy: Misconceptions and Misuses Revealed, from Astrology to the Moon Landing "Hoax" is a non-fiction book by the American astronomer Phil Plait, who is also known as "the Bad Astronomer". The book was published in 2002 and deals with various misunderstandings about space and astronomy, such as sounds being audible in space (a misconception because in the vacuum of space, sound has no medium in which to propagate).

Plait's first book received generally favorable reviews within the academic and astronomy communities and was the first volume in the Bad Science series by John Wiley & Sons Publishing

== Overview ==
Inspired by the author's web site, "Bad Astronomy", the book attempts to explore twenty-four common astronomical fallacies and explain the scientific consensus concerning these topics within the field of astronomy.

The book explains and corrects many ideas relating to space that, according to Plait, are mistaken but nevertheless often portrayed in popular movies. Plait also dedicates much of the book to debunking the idea of a Moon landing hoax and explains why astrology should not be taken seriously. A part of the book describes the Moon's tidal effects and explains the Coriolis effect, why the sky is blue, the Big Bang and other related topics.

Many of the book's topics and arguments also are found on Plait's page at the Slate magazine blog site, but Plait explores them in greater depth in the book. He states that the book is intended to debunk popular myths and also to describe science in an easily comprehensible way.

== Reception ==
Tormod Guldvog writes in his review that "It is indeed a gem when it comes to teaching things about common astronomical phenomena. Plait discusses common ways bad astronomy is communicated, in the media, in the classroom, and perhaps, most of all, in our own minds."

Reviewing Bad Astronomy for the National Science Teachers Association, Deborah Teuscher, Director of Pike Planetarium, praised the work as "interesting, accurate, and fun to read," recommending the book as a resource for science teachers, scientifically interested lay persons, and high school and college students as a supplement to an astronomy unit.

Publishers Weekly gave a generally favorable review, stating of the planned John Wiley & Sons "Bad Science" series that "[i]f every entry in the series is as entertaining as Plait's, good science may have a fighting chance with the American public."

An April 2002 review for UniSci's "Daily University Science News" also praised Bad Astronomy as the "ideal accompaniment for International Astronomy Day (April 20)" and quoted the author, stating that it is "dangerous to be ignorant about science. Our lives and our livelihoods depend on it."

In an October 2002 review for Sky & Telescope, Bud Sadler praised Bad Astronomy for its humor, "easily understood explanations" and "simple demonstrations" to explain what he called "the most egregious examples of ill-informed astronomy."

== Content ==
=== Bad Astronomy Begins at Home ===
Part I of Bad Astronomy, "Bad Astronomy Begins at Home", focuses on examples of astronomical misconceptions that are typically associated with the household or classroom, including the effect of the equinox on an egg's ability to balance upright without falling onto its side, the Coriolis effect's rumored effect on direction of whirlpools in household plumbing, and astronomical misunderstandings inherent in common English idioms, such as "meteoric rise" and "dark side of the Moon". "Idiom's Delight", the chapter dealing with scientific inaccuracies that appear in everyday expressions, such as the phrase "light years ahead".

=== From the Earth to the Moon ===
Part II of the book, "From the Earth to the Moon", focuses on Earth's orbit and atmosphere and the Moon, with particular emphasis on how photon scattering results in the sky appearing blue, the impact of axial tilt on seasons, the impact of the Moon's presence, and misconceptions regarding the "Moon Size Illusion", explaining why and how the Moon appears larger when closer to the horizon.

=== Skies at Night are Big and Bright ===
Part III, "Skies at Night are Big and Bright", concentrates on the viewing of objects farther away than the radius of the Moon's orbit around Earth, including the optical "twinkle" effect when viewing some stars, the brightness and color of stars, observation of meteors and asteroids, and using astronomical observations to study the beginning of the universe. Plait's chapter on meteors and asteroids delves into terms and distinctions and explains, for example, "why small meteors are cold, not hot, when they hit the ground."

=== Artificial Intelligence ===
Part IV, "Artificial Intelligence", attempts to tackle various conspiracy theories and alternate worldviews, including the so-called Moon Landing Hoax, Young-Earth Creationism, Immanuel Velikovsky's book Worlds in Collision (which asserts that a relatively young Venus was once a part of Jupiter), extraterrestrial claims regarding unidentified flying objects (UFOs), and astrology. In "Appalled at Apollo", the section devoted to Moon landing hoax conspiracy theories, Plait examines aspects of the hoax theory and compares its claims against basic laws of physics. Astronomical Society of the Pacific listed Chapter 17, "Appalled at Apollo", on a list of resources stating it was "good ammunition for debunking the notion that NASA never went to the Moon point by point." In the chapter "Misidentified Flying Objects", Plait discusses various ways that cameras sometimes distort images, which Plait writes are often responsible for examples of evidence presented by extraterrestrial UFO proponents. A chapter devoted to astrology explores the topic, explaining "why astrology doesn't work".

=== Beam Me Up ===
Part V, "Beam Me Up", explores additional topics, such as common misconceptions regarding the Hubble Space Telescope and its funding, star-naming companies, and astronomy myths and inaccuracies perpetuated by Hollywood, providing "The Top-Ten Examples of Bad Astronomy in Major Motion Pictures".

== Publications ==
- Plait, Philip C. (1 March 2002). Bad Astronomy: Misconceptions and Misuses Revealed, from Astrology to the Moon Landing "Hoax". New York: Wiley. ISBN 978-0-471-40976-2. OCLC 48885221.
- Bad Astronomy was the first volume in the planned series Bad Science published by John Wiley & Sons. A second volume, Bad Medicine, by Christopher Wanjek, was published in 2003 and was the most recent in the series.
- In 2008, Plait published a second book on astronomy, Death from the Skies, which explored the various ways in which the human race could be rendered extinct by astronomical phenomena.

== See also ==
- Death from the Skies
