= 4276 Clifford =

Asteroid

Discovery
- Discovered by: E. Bowell
- Discovery site: Lowell Obs.
- Discovery date: 2 December 1981

Designations
- Named after: Clifford Cunningham (Canadian astronomer)
- Alternative designations: 1981 XA
- Minor planet category: Mars-crosser · main belt

Orbital characteristics
- Epoch 4 September 2017 (JD 2458000.5)
- Uncertainty parameter 0
- Observation arc: 35.67 yr (13,027 days)
- Aphelion: 2.4195 AU
- Perihelion: 1.5994 AU
- Semi-major axis: 2.0095 AU
- Eccentricity: 0.2041
- Orbital period (sidereal): 2.85 yr (1,040 days)
- Mean anomaly: 186.63°
- Mean motion: 0° 20^{m} 45.6^{s} / day
- Inclination: 21.033°
- Longitude of ascending node: 76.881°
- Argument of perihelion: 3.5494°

Physical characteristics
- Dimensions: 4.441±1.128 km
- Geometric albedo: 0.142±0.107
- Spectral type: SMASS = Cb
- Absolute magnitude (H): 14.6

4276 Clifford, provisional designation1981 XA is an asteroid and sizable Mars-crosser from the innermost region of the asteroid belt, approximately 4.4 kilometers in diameter. It was discovered on 2 December 1981, by American astronomers Edward Bowell at Lowell Observatory in Flagstaff, United States. The asteroid was named in honor of astronomer and writer Clifford Cunningham.

== Orbit and classification ==
Clifford is a member of the group of main-belt asteroids known as Mars-crosser asteroids, specifically, it is listed as an Outer-grazer. It orbits the Sun at a distance of 1.6–2.4 AU once every 2 years and 10 months (1,040 days). Its orbit has an eccentricity of 0.20 and an inclination of 21° with respect to the ecliptic.

== Physical characteristics ==
In the SMASS classification, Clifford is a Cb-type, which transitions from the carbonaceous C-type asteroids to the rare B-type asteroids.

According to the survey carried out by NASA's Wide-field Infrared Survey Explorer with its subsequent NEOWISE mission, Clifford measures 4.441 kilometers in diameter and its surface has an albedo of 0.142. As of 2017, no rotational lightcurve has been obtained of Clifford. Its rotation period and shape remain unknown.

== Naming ==
This minor planet was named after Canadian astronomer and author Clifford Cunningham, who is best known for his 1988 published book Introduction to Asteroids and 5-volume history of asteroid studies published by Springer in 2016 and 2017. He received his Ph.D. in the history of astronomy in 2015. His astronomical work includes astrometry and photometry of minor planets. The approved naming citation was published by the Minor Planet Center on 10 April 1990 (M.P.C. 16248).
