= Developmentally appropriate practice =

Perspective within early childhood education

Developmentally appropriate practice (DAP) is a perspective within early childhood education whereby a teacher or child caregiver nurtures a child's social/emotional, physical, and cognitive development. It is also described as a philosophy in child education that is based on child development knowledge where professionals base their instruction and care on research, standards, and recognized theory.

== Concept ==
Developmentally appropriate practice (DAP) emphasizes what is known about children and what can be done about individual children as a basis of decision-making when it comes to instruction and care. It recognizes that children's needs and abilities change over time and depend on universal laws governing these to determine the propriety of practice. DAP also holds that children have a natural disposition towards learning; hence, they are capable of constructing their own knowledge through exploration and interaction with others, learning materials, and their environment. For these reasons, early childhood programs look and function differently.

The DAP has three core components: knowledge about development and learning; knowledge about individual children; and, knowledge about the social and cultural contexts where children grow and learn. Particularly, the teacher or provider of care bases all practices and decisions on (1) theories of child development, (2) individually identified strengths and needs of each child uncovered through authentic assessment, and (3) the child's cultural background as defined by his community, family history, and family structure.

DAP is centered around the instructors "intentionality" of their instruction so that students are able to accomplish goals that are "both challenging and achievable for children". In DAP, knowledge of child development is valued because it "permits general predictions" to be made by instructors to influence what instruction should be used to best benefit student learning based on their developmental stage. It influences teacher decisions on which "environment, materials, interaction and activities" should be used in the classroom based on "broad predictions" of children in particular age groups. Knowledge of the individual child is another core consideration of DAP because, through observation, teachers may learn "implications for how to best adapt" instruction based on the specific needs of an individual student. The last core consideration for DAP, is that instructors should also learn more about the social and cultural contexts children grow up in their homes. This is valued so students learn and grow through instruction that is "meaningful, relevant, and respectful for each child and family".

== Learning standard ==
The National Association for the Education of Young Children (NAEYC) has adopted DAP as part of its attempt to establish standards for best practice in the area of the education of children (from birth to 8 years of age). This was established in a position statement, which some scholars view has contributed to the thinking and discourse about practices in early childhood programs. The statement described DAP as an "empirically based principles of child development and learning".

=== Updates in 2020 position statement ===
In the updated 2020 position statement, NAEYC admitted that previous position statements painted social and cultural differences "as deficits and gaps" instead of viewing them as "assets or strengths to be built upon". The revisions made were in hopes to highlight the updated core considerations:

(1) There are "greater variations" within the stages of development, which the previous versions failed to realize the "critical role" social and cultural differences have on student learning and development.

(2) While children need to learn and understand different social and cultural contexts, educators also need to recognize their own "biases—both implicit and explicit" to ensure their teaching does not negatively impact student learning.

Studies have revealed that the use of DAP has led to an increase in children's receptive language, particularly in DAP programs that include higher-literacy environment and developmentally appropriate activities.

=== Implications for instruction ===
There are different suggestions for teachers to engage in developmentally appropriate practice depending on students' stage of development.

- Infants
  - Set an environment that prompts exploration and make sure it is safe and stimulating
  - Meet physical needs of the infant by providing clean and quiet areas
  - Support infants' families by providing culturally sensitive care
- Early childhood
  - Provide assurance to children who may have difficulties separating from their guardian
  - Allow children to explore classroom environment
  - Foster joy for literature in children
- Middle childhood
  - Encourage families and caregivers to be actively involved in activities
  - Make sure students acquire basic academic skills, such as letter identification and sound correspondence
  - Allow students to form positive relationships with peers with guidance
- Early adolescence
  - Design a curriculum that will challenge students to incorporate knowledge and skills across multiple content areas
  - Assign an adult to check the welfare of each student

== Critics ==
DAP is one of a number of practices associated with outcome-based education and other progressive education reform movements. Some critics have argued that some reforms which fully support "developmentally appropriate practices", such as NCTM mathematics and whole language, introduce students to materials and concepts which may be too advanced for young children, or above their reading levels. On the opposite side, some critics claim that DAP approaches use content and concepts considerably below traditional grade levels. Educators in many states implement DAP approaches to meet learning standards that were established by specialized professional associations, including in the content areas of language arts, math, social studies and science. The National Science Education Standards proposes to teach elementary school students how to construct their own experiments, whereas traditionally high school students and even college students were typically taught how to perform pre-designed experiments, but not to construct their own experiments. In the DAP environment, through intentional teaching techniques, as well as by capitalizing on teachable moments, children are engaged in authentic, meaningful learning experiences. Educators do not just teach to the whole group, but use a variety of grouping strategies, including small groups, pairs and 1:1. Individualization becomes a key component in making sure the needs and interests of each child are focused on in a DAP environment. The developmentally appropriate practice is based upon the idea that children learn best from doing. Children learn best when they are actively involved in their environment and build knowledge based on their experiences rather than through passively receiving information. Active learning environments promote hands-on learning experiences and allow children to interact with objects in their environment, as well as their peers and teachers.
