= Traveling in Sin =

2013 memoir by Lisa Ellen Niver and George Rajna

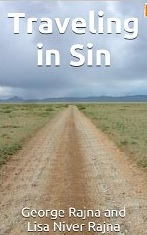
- Traveling in Sin, 11 Months, 12 Countries, 60 pounds & 1 Proposal
- Author: Lisa Ellen Niver, George Rajna
- Language: English
- Genre: Non-fiction
- Publisher: We Said Go Travel
- Publication date: 2013
- Media type: E-Book
- ISBN: 9780989711906

Traveling in Sin is a memoir by American authors Lisa Ellen Niver and George Rajna of We Said Go Travel that is written in the voices of the story's two leading protagonists, who met online in January 2007.

== Background ==
After exchanging emails and dating, the couple travels to Fiji over the summer of 2008 where George reveals his lifelong dream to travel the world for a year and urges Lisa to join him. With much convincing, the duo embark on a journey that takes them from French Polynesia to New Zealand and Australia. From that point on, the "true" adventure begins as they journey by land across vast portions of Asia, covering Indonesia to Mongolia. During these adventures, Lisa shrinks down to her waist size while developing her inner courage and belief in herself; George learns to open up his heart to form a team-based relationship that leads to a culminating special proposal.

== Contents ==
Peppered with humorous characters, tears of joy and disaster, and different realities related to their varied social strata and travel style, Niver and Rajna meander around Asia seeing the sights, building their relationship and returning to the United States in love and excited about their imminent wedding. Having both taken a leap leaving their jobs, home, cat and culture, they land together.
