= Clifford Cunningham =

Canadian astronomer

Clifford J. Cunningham is a Canadian-Scottish professional astronomer and author of numerous books on asteroids.

== Biography ==
He obtained his Bachelor of Science degree from the University of Waterloo; upon enrollment, at age 15, he was the youngest student ever to attend UW. In 1991 he earned his BA in Classical Studies. For his book Introduction to Asteroids (1988) and development of The Minor Planet Index to Scientific Papers (currently on the small bodies node of the Planetary Data System managed by NASA), an asteroid was named in his honour. Asteroid 4276 was named Clifford. His work after graduation included astronomical observations at Lowell Observatory; studies in the microbiology department of the University of Guelph; software analysis for Computing Canada; and senior writer in multimedia for the Ontario Lottery Corporation. He was a contributing editor to Mercury magazine (from 2001 until it ended publication in 2025), and a contributor to The Astronomical Calendar (1988–2013). In 1999 he appeared as a Starfleet officer on the TV show Star Trek: Deep Space Nine. In 2013 he became affiliated with NARIT, the National Astronomical Research Institute of Thailand. In 2016 he was appointed an associate editor of the Journal of Astronomical History & Heritage, and in 2014 a contributor to Encyclopædia Britannica. In 2020 he was one of 100 world experts commissioned by Britannica to write its Kid's Encyclopedia. He earned his PhD in the history of astronomy at the University of Southern Queensland (USQ) in Australia in 2015. He is now a Research Fellow at USQ, and became one of three Series Editors of Historical and Cultural Astronomy books for Springer in June 2019. In 2020 he was elected to membership in the International Astronomical Union (IAU), and as of 2022 is a member of Commission 3 (History of Astronomy).

After years of research, Dr. Cunningham finally discovered who coined the word 'asteroid'. Although 'asteroid' has been attributed to the famous astronomer William Herschel, Cunningham found evidence that it was proposed by Greek expert Charles Burney Jr., the son of a friend of Herschel. In 2014 he discovered a previously unrecognised allusion to the aurora borealis in Milton's Paradise Lost. In 2020 he published evidence that Manilius, not Hipparchus, developed the numerical stellar magnitude system. His seventh asteroid book was published in 2021. In development is an edited book on history of astronomy in the 18th century, which will be published by Bloomsbury; and a chapter on the science fiction aspects of asteroid and cometary impacts, for an edited book entitled Cosmic Apocalypse. In development is a book to be published in 2031, on the centenary of the international Eros Parallax Project.

== Awards and honors ==
In 1990, the Mars-crossing asteroid 4276 Clifford, discovered by American astronomer Edward Bowell in 1981, was named in his honor. The official naming citation was published by the Minor Planet Center on 10 April 1990 (M.P.C. 16248).

== Publications ==
- Introduction to Asteroids (1988) published by Willmann-Bell Inc., Richmond, Virginia. ISBN 0943396166
- Discovery of the Missing Correspondence between Carl Friedrich Gauss and the Rev. Nevil Maskelyne (2004) – Annals of Science 61 (4), pg. 469–480.
- How the First Dwarf Planet Became the Asteroid Ceres (2009) – Journal of Astronomical History and Heritage vol. 12 (3), pg. 240–248.
- The Attribution of Classical Deities in the Iconography of Giuseppe Piazzi (2011) – Journal of Astronomical History and Heritage 14(2), 129–135.
- Giuseppe Piazzi: the controversial discovery and loss of Ceres in 1801. (2011) – Journal for the History of Astronomy, 42, part 3, 283–306.
- Olbers's Planetary Explosion Hypothesis. (2013) – Journal for the History of Astronomy, 44, 187–205.
- Classical Deities in Astronomy: The Employment of Verse to Commemorate the Discovery of the Planets Uranus, Ceres, Pallas, Juno and Vesta. (2013). – Culture and Cosmos. Special issue: Literature and the Stars, 17, 3–29.
- Discovery of the origin of the word "asteroid" and the Related Terms "asteroidal", "planetoid", "planetkin", "planetule" and "cometoid." (2015) – Studia Etymologica Cracoviensia, 20, 47–62.
- The Clash Between William Herschel and the Great German ‘Amateur’ Astronomer Johann Schroeter. In: New Insights from Recent Studies in Historical Astronomy, 205–222. (2015), published by Springer. ISBN 978-3319076133
- Milton's Paradise Lost: Previously Unrecognized Allusions to the Aurora Borealis, and a Solution to the Comet Conundrum in Book 2. (2016). – Renaissance and Reformation, 39(1), 5–33.
- Discovery of the First Asteroid Ceres (2016), published by Springer. ISBN 978-3319217765
- Early Investigations of Ceres, and the Discovery of Pallas (2016), published by Springer. ISBN 978-3319288130
- Studies of Pallas in the Early Nineteenth Century (2017), published by Springer. ISBN 978-3319328461
- Bode's Law and the Discovery of Juno (2017), published by Springer. ISBN 978-3319328737
- Investigating the Origin of the Asteroids and Early Findings on Vesta (2017), published by Springer. ISBN 978-3319581170
- The Scientific Legacy of William Herschel (2017), edited by Clifford Cunningham, published by Springer. ISBN 978-3319328256
- The Collected Correspondence of Baron Franz Xaver von Zach; 7 volumes published between 2004 and 2009
- Herschel's Spurious Moons of Uranus: Their Impact on Satellite Orbital Theory, Celestial Cartography and Literature. (2020) – Journal of Astronomical History and Heritage 23(1), 119–162.
- 'Dark Stars' and a New Interpretation of the Ancient Greek Stellar Magnitude System. (2020) – Journal of Astronomical History and Heritage 23(2), 231–256.
- The Seven Sisters: A Pleiades Cantata. (2021) – Journal of Astronomical History and Heritage 24(2), 345–362.
- Asteroids (2021) published by Reaktion Press, London. ISBN 978-1789143584
- Some Early Astrological Musings on Asteroids. (2021) – Geocosmic Journal, Spring issue, 59–65.
- The Origins and Legacy of Kepler's Gap. In: Towards Mysteries of the Cosmos with Johannes Kepler on the 450th Anniversary of His Birth, 95–132. (2022), published by Jagiellonian University Astronomical Observatory and Astronomia Nova Association. ISBN 978-8395701627
- The Evolution of 'Meteor' as an Astronomical Trope 1560-1760. In: Essays on Astronomical History and Heritage, 341-366. (2023), published by Springer. ISBN 978-3031294921
- Tycho's Conversation with Urania, and other engagements with the Muse. (2024) – Journal of Astronomical History and Heritage 27(1), 105–126.
- The Solar System (2025) published by Reaktion Press, London. ISBN 978-1836390640
- Cosmic Events: The Three Comets of 1618 (2026) published by Springer, Cham.ISBN 978-3031869495

== See also ==
- List of University of Waterloo people
- University of Southern Queensland
