= Mercury (magazine) =

Science magazine

- Editor: James C. White II
- Categories: Astronomy
- Frequency: Quarterly
- Publisher: Astronomical Society of the Pacific
- Founded: 1972
- Final issue: 2008 (print)
- Company: Astronomical Society of the Pacific
- Country: United States
- Based in: San Francisco
- Language: English
- Website: astrosociety.org/news-publications/mercury-magazine/
- ISSN: 0047-6773

Mercury is an online quarterly science magazine that features articles and columns about astronomy for a general audience published by the Astronomical Society of the Pacific (ASP) for its members.

== History ==
The first issue of Mercury was published in January 1972 as a bimonthly popular journal to boost public understanding of astronomy and act as a science communication platform to interpret the results of astronomical research for the nonspecialist. In 2007, the magazine was offered in printed and digital form, transitioning to all-digital the following year. Mercury continues as an ASP members-only digital publication and, as of 2019, the publicly-accessible Mercury Online companion blog was launched, featuring articles from the Mercury archives.

Editors of Mercury over the years include Leon Salanave, Richard Reis, Andrew Fraknoi, Sally Stephens, James C. White II (3x), George Musser, Robert Naeye, Paul Deans, Ian O'Neill, and Liz Kruesi.

Mercury has its headquarters in San Francisco. Contributors include (as of 2019): Jennifer Birriel, Clifford Cunningham, Matthew R. Francis, C. Renee James, Brian Kruse, Arianna Long, Jason Major, Steve Murray, James Negus, M. Katy Rodriguez Wimberly, Linda Shore, Tracy Staedter, Christopher Wanjek.
