= Science, technology, society and environment education =

Science, technology, society and environment (STSE) education, originates from the science technology and society (STS) movement in science education. This is an outlook on science education that emphasizes the teaching of scientific and technological developments in their cultural, economic, social and political contexts. In this view of science education, students are encouraged to engage in issues pertaining to the impact of science on everyday life and make responsible decisions about how to address such issues.

== Science technology and society (STS) ==
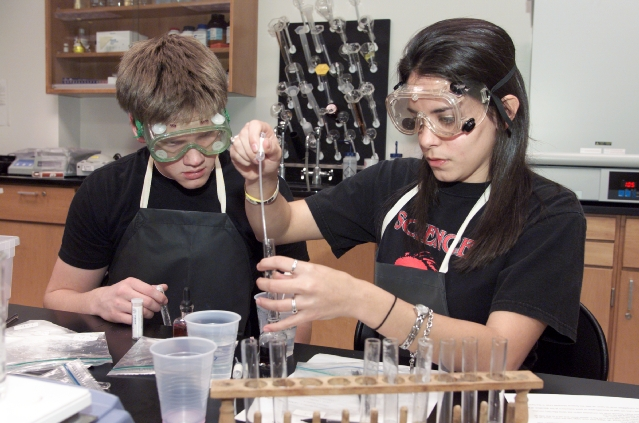

The STS movement has a long history in science education reform, and embraces a wide range of theories about the intersection between science, technology and society. Over the last twenty years, the work of Peter Fensham, the noted Australian science educator, is considered to have heavily contributed to reforms in science education. Fensham's efforts included giving greater prominence to STS in the school science curriculum. The key aim behind these efforts was to ensure the development of a broad-based science curriculum, embedded in the socio-political and cultural contexts in which it was formulated. From Fensham's point of view, this meant that students would engage with different viewpoints on issues concerning the impact of science and technology on everyday life. They would also understand the relevance of scientific discoveries, rather than just concentrate on learning scientific facts and theories that seemed distant from their realities (Fensham, 1985).

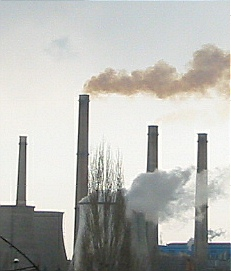

However, although the wheels of change in science education had been set in motion during the late 1970s, it was not until the 1980s that STS perspectives began to gain a serious footing in science curricula, in largely Western contexts. This occurred at a time when issues such as, animal testing, environmental pollution and the growing impact of technological innovation on social infrastructure, were beginning to raise ethical, moral, economic and political dilemmas. There were also concerns among communities of researchers, educators and governments pertaining to the general public's lack of understanding about the interface between science and society (Bodmer, 1985; Durant et al. 1989).

In addition, alarmed by the poor state of scientific literacy among school students, science educators began to grapple with the quandary of how to prepare students to be informed and active citizens, as well as the scientists, medics and engineers of the future. Hence, STS advocates called for reforms in science education that would equip students to understand scientific developments in their cultural, economic, political and social contexts. This was considered important in making science accessible and meaningful to all students—and, most significantly, engaging them in real world issues (Fensham 1985).

== Goals of STS ==
The key goals of STS are:

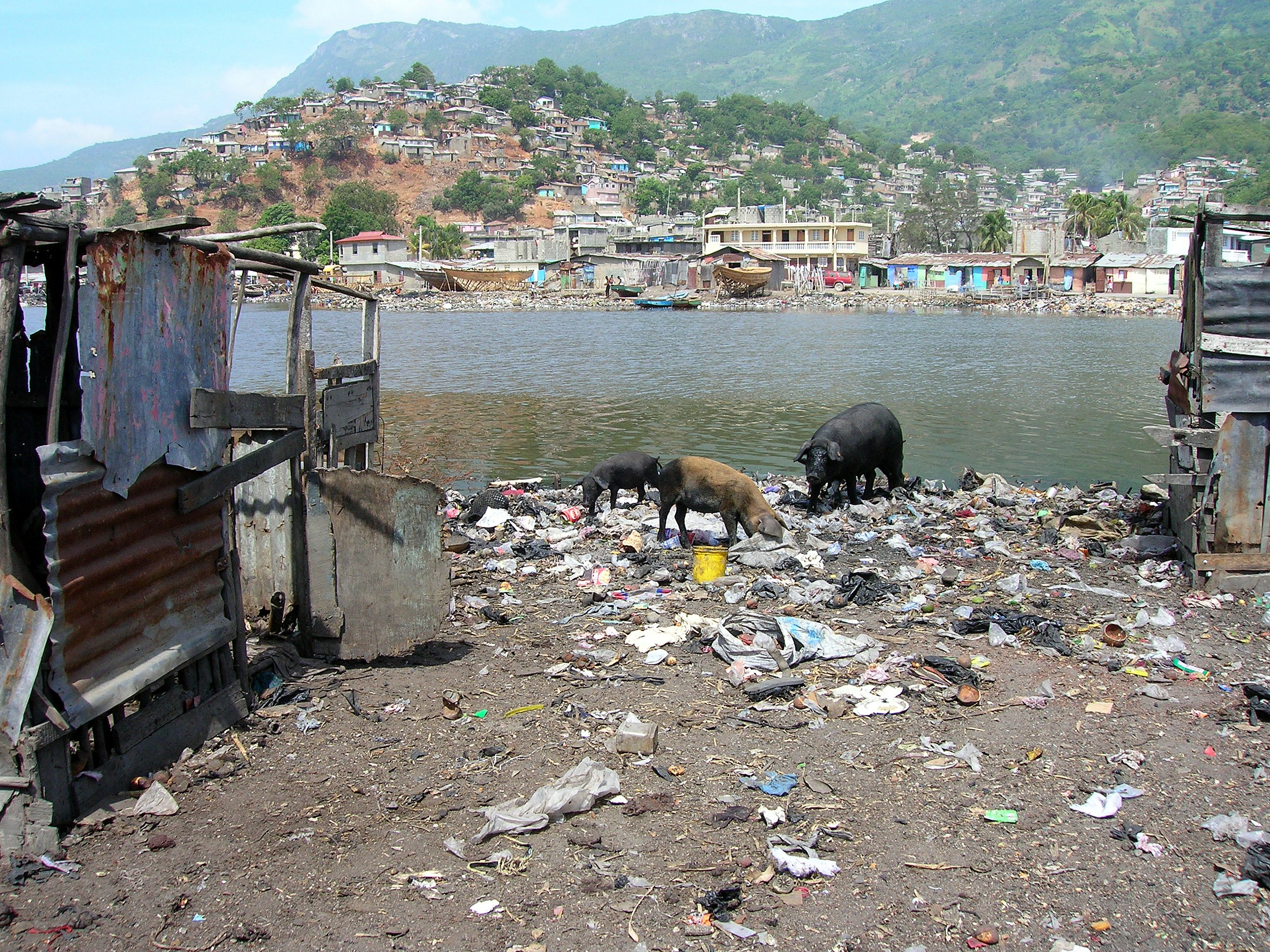

- An interdisciplinary HI approach to science education, where there is a seamless integration of economic, ethical, social and political aspects of scientific and technological developments in the science curriculum.
- Engaging students in examining a variety of real world issues and grounding scientific knowledge in such realities. In today's world, such issues might include the impact on society of: global warming, genetic engineering, animal testing, deforestation practices, nuclear testing and environmental legislations, such as the EU Waste Legislation or the Kyoto Protocol.
- Enabling students to formulate a critical understanding of the interface between science, society and technology.
- Developing students’ capacities and confidence to make informed decisions, and to take responsible action to address issues arising from the impact of science on their daily lives.

== STSE education ==
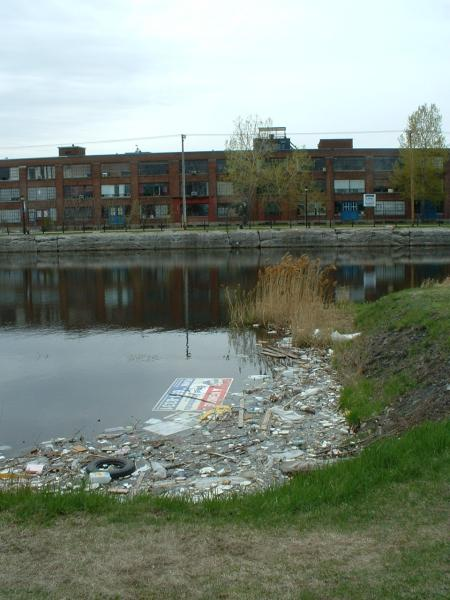

There is no uniform definition for STSE education. As mentioned before, STSE is a form of STS education, but places greater emphasis on the environmental consequences of scientific and technological developments. In STSE curricula, scientific developments are explored from a variety of economic, environmental, ethical, moral, social and political perspectives.

At best, STSE education can be loosely defined as a movement that attempts to bring about an understanding of the interface between science, society, technology and the environment. A key goal of STSE is to help students realize the significance of scientific developments in their daily lives and foster a voice of active citizenship.

=== Improving scientific literacy ===
Over the last two decades, STSE education has taken a prominent position in the science curricula of different parts of the world, such as Australia, Europe, the UK and USA. In Canada, the inclusion of STSE perspectives in science education has largely come about as a consequence of the Common Framework of science learning outcomes, Pan Canadian Protocol for collaboration on School Curriculum (1997). This document highlights a need to develop scientific literacy in conjunction with understanding the interrelationships between science, technology, and environment. According to Osborne (2000) & Hodson (2003), scientific literacy can be perceived in four different ways:

- Cultural: Developing the capacity to read about and understand issues pertaining to science and technology in the media.
- Utilitarian: Having the knowledge, skills and attitudes that are essential for a career as scientist, engineer or technician.
- Democratic: Broadening knowledge and understanding of science to include the interface between science, technology and society.
- Economic: Formulating knowledge and skills that are essential to the economic growth and effective competition within the global market place.

However, many science teachers find it difficult and even damaging to their professional identities to teach STSE as part of science education due to the fact that traditional science focuses on established scientific facts rather than philosophical, political, and social issues, the extent of which many educators find to be devaluing to the scientific curriculum.

=== Goals ===
In the context of STSE education, the goals of teaching and learning are largely directed towards engendering cultural and democratic notions of scientific literacy. Here, advocates of STSE education argue that in order to broaden students' understanding of science, and better prepare them for active and responsible citizenship in the future, the scope of science education needs to go beyond learning about scientific theories, facts and technical skills. Therefore, the fundamental aim of STSE education is to equip students to understand and situate scientific and technological developments in their cultural, environmental, economic, political and social contexts.

For example, rather than learning about the facts and theories of weather patterns, students can explore them in the context of issues such as global warming. They can also debate the environmental, social, economic and political consequences of relevant legislation, such as the Kyoto Protocol. This is thought to provide a richer, more meaningful and relevant canvas against which scientific theories and phenomena relating to weather patterns can be explored.

In essence, STSE education aims to develop the following skills and perspectives:

- Social responsibility
- Critical thinking and decision-making skills
- The ability to formulate sound ethical and moral decisions about issues arising from the impact of science on our daily lives
- Knowledge, skills and confidence to express opinions and take responsible action to address real world issues

=== Curriculum content ===
Since STSE education has multiple facets, there are a variety of ways in which it can be approached in the classroom. This offers teachers a degree of flexibility, not only in the incorporation of STSE perspectives into their science teaching, but in integrating other curricular areas such as history, geography, social studies and language arts. The table below summarizes the different approaches to STSE education described in the literature:

=== Summary table: Curriculum content ===
Approach	Description	Example
Historical	A way of humanizing science. This approach examines the history of science through concrete examples, and is viewed as way of demonstrating the fallibility of science and scientists.	Learning about inventions or scientific theories through the lives and worlds of famous scientist. Students can research their areas of interest and present them through various activities: e.g. drama-role play, debates or documentaries. Through this kind of exploration, students examine the values, beliefs and attitudes that influenced the work of scientists, their outlook on the world, and how their work has impacted our present circumstances and understanding of science today.
Philosophical	Helps students formulate an understanding of the different outlooks on the nature of science, and how differing viewpoints on the nature and validity of scientific knowledge influence the work of scientists—demonstrating how society directs and reacts to scientific innovation.	Using historical narratives or stories of scientific discoveries to concretely examine philosophical questions and views about science. For example, The Double Helix by James D. Watson is an account of the discovery of DNA. This historical narrative can be used to explore questions such as: “What is science? What kind of research was done to make this discovery? How did this scientific development influence our lives? Can science help us understand everything about our world?” Such an exploration reveals the social and historical context of philosophical debates about the nature of science—making this kind of inquiry concrete, meaningful and applicable to students’ realities.
Issues-based	This is the most widely applied approach to STSE education. It stimulates an understanding of the science behind issues, and the consequences to society and the environment. A multi-faceted approach to examining issues highlights the complexities of real-life debates. Students also become aware of the various motives for decisions that address environmental issues.	Real life events within the community, at the national or international level, can be examined from political, economic, ethical and social perspectives through presentations, debates, role-play, documentaries and narratives. Real life events might include: the impact of environmental legislations, industrial accidents and the influence of particular scientific or technological innovations on society and the environment.

=== Opportunities and challenges of STSE education ===
Although advocates of STSE education keenly emphasize its merits in science education, they also recognize inherent difficulties in its implementation. The opportunities and challenges of STSE education have been articulated by Hughes (2000) and Pedretti & Forbes (2000), at five different levels, as described below:

Values & beliefs: The goals of STSE education may challenge the values and beliefs of students and teachers—as well as conventional, culturally entrenched views on scientific and technological developments. Students gain opportunities to engage with, and deeply examine the impact of scientific development on their lives from a critical and informed perspective. This helps to develop students' analytical and problem solving capacities, as well as their ability to make informed choices in their everyday lives.

As they plan and implement STSE education lessons, teachers need to provide a balanced view of the issues being explored. This enables students to formulate their own thoughts, independently explore other opinions and have the confidence to voice their personal viewpoints. Teachers also need to cultivate safe, non-judgmental classroom environments, and must also be careful not to impose their own values and beliefs on students.

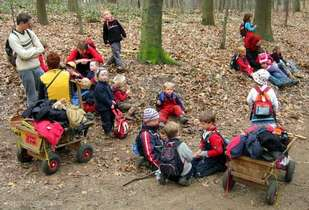

Knowledge & understanding: The interdisciplinary nature of STSE education requires teachers to research and gather information from a variety of sources. At the same time, teachers need to develop a sound understanding of issues from various disciplines—philosophy, history, geography, social studies, politics, economics, environment and science. This is so that students’ knowledge base can be appropriately scaffolded to enable them to effectively engage in discussions, debates and decision-making processes.

This ideal raises difficulties. Most science teachers are specialized in a particular field of science. Lack of time and resources may affect how deeply teachers and students can examine issues from multiple perspectives. Nevertheless, a multi-disciplinary approach to science education enables students to gain a more rounded perspective on the dilemmas, as well as the opportunities, that science presents in our daily lives.

Pedagogic approach: Depending on teacher experience and comfort levels, a variety of pedagogic approaches based on constructivism can be used to stimulate STSE education in the classroom. As illustrated in the table below, the pedagogies used in STSE classrooms need to take students through different levels of understanding to develop their abilities and confidence to critically examine issues and take responsible action.

Teachers are often faced with the challenge of transforming classroom practices from task-oriented approaches to those which focus on developing students' understanding and transferring agency for learning to students. The table below is a compilation of pedagogic approaches for STSE education described in the literature:

== Projects in the field of STSE ==
=== Science and the City ===
STSE education draws on holistic ways of knowing, learning, and interacting with science. A recent movement in science education has bridged science and technology education with society and environment awareness through critical explorations of place. The project Science and the city, for example, took place during the school years 2006-2007 and 2007-2008 involving an intergenerational group of researchers: 36 elementary students (grades 6, 7 & 8) working with their teachers, 6 university-based researchers, parents and community members.

The goal was to come together, learn science and technology together, and use this knowledge to provide meaningful experiences that make a difference to the lives of friends, families, communities and environments that surround the school. The collective experience allowed students, teachers and learners to foster imagination, responsibility, collaboration, learning and action. The project has led to a series of publications:

- Alsop, S., & Ibrahim, S. 2008. Visual journeys in critical place based science education. In Y-J. Lee, & A-K. Tan (Eds.), Science education at the nexus of theory and practice. Rotterdam: SensePublishers 291–303.
- Alsop, S., & Ibrahim, S. 2007. Searching for Science Motive: Community, Imagery and Agency. Alberta Science Education Journal (Special Edition, Shapiro, B. (Ed.) Research and writing in science education of interest to those new in the profession). 38(2), 17–24.

Science and the city: A Field Zine

One collective publication, authored by the students, teachers and researchers together is that of a community zine that offered a format to share possibilities afforded by participatory practices that connect schools with local-knowledges, people and places.

*Alsop, S., Ibrahim, S., & Blimkie, M. (Eds.) (2008) Science and the city: A Field Zine. Toronto: Ontario. [An independent publication written by students and researchers and distributed free to research, student and parent communities].

=== Tokyo Global Engineering Corporation, Japan (and global) ===
Tokyo Global Engineering Corporation is an education-services organization that provides capstone STSE education programs free of charge to engineering students and other stakeholders. These programs are intended to complement—but not to replace—STSE coursework required by academic degree programs of study. The programs are educational opportunities, so students are not paid for their participation. All correspondence among members is completed via e-mail, and all meetings are held via Skype, with English as the language of instruction and publication. Students and other stakeholders are never asked to travel or leave their geographic locations, and are encouraged to publish organizational documents in their personal, primary languages, when English is a secondary language.

== See also ==
- Citizen Science, cleanup projects that people can take part in.
- Educational assessment
- Learning theory (education)
- Science
- STEM fields

== Bibliography ==
- Aikenhead, G.S. (1994) "What is STS science teaching?" In Solomon, J. & G. Aikenhead (eds.), STS Education: International Perspectives in Reform. New York: Teacher's College Press.
- Alsop, S. & Hicks, K. (eds.), (2001) Teaching Science. London: Kogan Page.
- Bencze, J.L. (editor) (2017). Science & technology education promoting wellbeing for individuals, societies & environments. Dordrecht: Springer.
- Bodmer, W., F. (1985) The Public Understanding of Science. London: The Royal Society
- Durant, J., R., Evans, G.A., & Thomas, G.P. (1989) The public understanding of science. Nature, 340, pp. 11–14.
- Fensham, P.J. (1985) Science for all. Journal of Curriculum Studies, 17: pp 415–435.
- Fensham, P.J. (1988) Familiar but different: Some dilemmas and new directions in science education. In P.J. Fensham (ed.), Developments and dilemmas in science education. New York: Falmer Press pp. 1–26.
- Harrington, Maria C.R. (2009). An ethnographic comparison of real and virtual reality field trips to Trillium Trail: The salamander find as a Salient Event. In Freier, N.G. & Kahn, P.H. (Eds.), Children, Youth and Environments: Special Issue on Children in Technological Environments, 19 (1): [page-page]. http://www.colorado.edu/journals/cye.
- Hodson, D. (2003) Time for action: Science education for an alternative future. International Journal of Science Education, 25 (6): pp. 645–670.
- Millar, R. (1996) Towards a science curriculum for public understanding. School Science Review, 77 (280): pp. 7–18.
- Pedretti, E. (1996) Learning about science, technology and society (STS) through an action research project: co-constructing an issues based model for STS education. School Science and Mathematics, 96 (8), pp. 432–440.
- Pedretti, E., Hewitt, J., Bencze, L., Jiwani, A. & van Oostveen, R. (2004) Contextualizing and promoting Science, Technology, Society and Environment (STSE) perspectives through multi-media case methods in science teacher education. In D.B Zandvliet (Ed.), Proceedings of the annual conference of the National Association for Research in Science Teaching, Vancouver, BC. CD ROM.
