= Constructivism in science education =

Constructivism has been considered as a dominant paradigm, or research programme, in the field of science education since the 1980s. The term constructivism is widely used in many fields, and not always with quite the same intention. This entry offers an account of how constructivism is most commonly understood in science education.

== Description ==
Science education is now an established field within education, and worldwide has its own journals, conferences, university departments and so forth. Although a diverse field, a major influence on its development was research considered to be undertaken from a constructivist perspective on learning, and supporting approaches to teaching that themselves became labelled constructivist. Thus, this constructivism was largely of a psychological flavour, often drawing on the work of Jean Piaget, David Ausubel, Robert M. Gagné and Jerome Bruner. One influential group of science education researchers were also heavily influenced by George Kelly's Personal Construct Theory. The work of Lev Vygotsky (since being championed in the West by Jerome Bruner) has also been increasingly influential.

These workers from psychology informed the first generation of science education researchers. Active research groups developed in centres like the University of Waikato (New Zealand), University of Leeds (UK) and University of Surrey (UK), with a strong interest in students' ideas in science (formed before, or during instruction) as these were recognised as being highly influential on future learning, and so whether canonical scientific would be learnt. This work, sometimes labelled the 'alternative conceptions movement' was motivated by a series of influential publications on children's ideas in science and their implications for learning (and so for how teaching should be planned to take them into account). Whilst a range of influential papers could be cited it has been suggested that a number of seminar contributions in effect set out the commitments, or 'hard core' of a constructivist research programme into the learning and teaching of science. The perspective was also the focus of a number of books aimed at the science education community - researchers and teachers.

These papers presented learning as process of personal sense making, and an iterative matter such that what is learnt was channelled by existing knowledge and understanding (whether canonical or alternative), and teaching as needing to take learners' existing ideas into account in teaching. The research programme soon amounted to thousands of studies on aspects of students' (of different ages and educational levels, from different countries) thinking and learning in science topics.

== Criticisms ==
There have been a wide range of criticisms of constructivist work in science, including strong criticism from philosophical perspectives. Such criticisms have done little to stem the influence of the perspective, perhaps because they tend not to refer to the core tenets of constructivism as an approach based on learning theory and research from cognitive science.

== Alternative conceptions and conceptual frameworks in science education ==
Learners' ideas in science have been variously labelled as alternative conceptions, alternative conceptual frameworks, preconceptions, scientific misconceptions, naive theories etc. Although some scholars have attempted to distinguish between these terms, there is no consensual usage and often these terms are in effect synonymous. It has been found that some alternative conceptions are very common, although others appear quite idiosyncratic. Some seem to be readily overcome in teaching, but others have proved to be tenacious and to offer a challenge to effective instruction. Sometimes it is considered important to distinguish fully developed conceptions (i.e., explicit ways of understanding aspects of the natural work that are readily verbalised) from more 'primitive' features of cognition acting at a tacit level, such as the so-called phenomenology primitives. The 'knowledge-in-pieces' perspective suggests the latter act as resources for new learning which have potential to support the development of either alternative or canonical knowledge according to how teachers proceed, whereas alternative conceptions (or misconceptions) tend to be seen as learning impediments to be overcome. What research has shown is the prevalence among learners at all levels of alternative ways to thinking about just about all science topics, and a key feature of guidance to teachers is to elicit students' ideas as part of the teaching process. The success of constructivism is that this is now largely taken-for-granted in science teaching and has become part of standard teaching guidance in many contexts. Previously there was a strong focus on the abstract nature of concepts to be learnt, but little awareness that often the teacher was not seeking to replace ignorance with knowledge, but rather to modify and develop learners existing thinking which was often at odds with the target knowledge set out in the curriculum.

=== Constructivist science teaching ===
Constructivism is seen as an educational theory, and a key perspective to inform pedagogy. There are many books informing teachers and others about constructivist research findings and ideas, and giving guidance on how to teach science from a constructivist perspective.

== See also ==
- Constructivist teaching methods
