= Hands On Science Outreach, Inc. =

Hands On Science Outreach, Inc. was a national nonprofit organization registered in Maryland, United States. The organization was founded by Phyllis Katz, Ph.D. in 1980 to offer informal science education programs for elementary school age children. The program was in operation from 1984 to 2007. Their first program was entitled "Hands On Science Outreach".
