= We Said Go Travel =

Online travel blog platform

We Said Go Travel banner from We Said Go Travel website by Lisa Ellen Niver

We Said Go Travel is an online blog with over sixteen hundred writers from seventy five countries contributing articles. Stories are shared with photos and video from a perspective of the transformative power of travel. We Said Go Travel has hosted live and online events as well as travel writing contests.

== History ==
The original blog began on Blogspot, made by Lisa Ellen Niver, a member of the Travelers' Century Club. The We Said Go Travel website. The site was created as a platform for a travel memoir about a sabbatical year which included an underwater engagement, losing sixty pounds in weight and visiting twelve countries. Subsequently in March 2011, a larger platform was required and a full website was created.

In April 2011, Niver was invited to have a "We Said Go Travel" Blog on the Jewish Journal. Various social media sites were used for promotion. In April 2011, a YouTube channel was added and as of March 2015, there are over 340 videos and over 300,000 views.

The founder was invited to speak in Kathmandu in April 2013 by the Nepal Tourism Board, where she read from her travel memoir for the first time. The feature editor interviewed them and had a full-page article published in the Himalayan Times.

In March 2013, The Nomadic Family rated We Said Go Travel as #5 of the Top 50 Best Travel Blogs of 2012. In August 2013, We Said Go Travel was added to the ninth edition of Nomadic Samuel's Top 100 Travel Blogs at #97. In December 2013, the site moved to #79 on the list.

Niver also blogs on the Huffington Post. Her first Huffington Post articles were a "He Said, She Said" on her travels in Bagan, Myanmar. In July 2013, We Said Go Travel published the memoir Traveling in Sin by Lisa Ellen Niver and George Rajna about their first year sabbatical in Asia.

== Recognition ==
The blog has been featured in some industry best blog lists.

== See also ==
- Family Travel Forum
