= Death from the Skies! =

2008 book by Phil Plait

- Hardcover of Death from the Skies!
- Author: Philip C. Plait
- Subject: Astronomy
- Publisher: Viking Adult
- Publication date: October 16, 2008
- Pages: 336
- ISBN: 978-0670019977
- OCLC: 213308770

Death from the Skies!: These Are The Ways The World Will End is a book by the American astronomer Phil Plait, also known as "the Bad Astronomer". The book was published in 2008 and explores the various ways in which the human race could be rendered extinct by astronomical phenomena.

== Background ==
The author stated during an interview that one of the reasons for writing the book was that "the Universe is incredibly inhospitable, yet we have this planet that's doing OK by us. Another is that the Universe is incredibly cool and interesting. Black holes are really fun to think about. Actually, most of this is mind-stretching and fun. What happens to the Sun after 100 quadrillion years? One hundred octillion? A googol?" He also said that the reason for using doomsday scenarios was to take a scientific viewpoint, make it like a roller coaster or horror movie to make it fun and exciting. The stories were not to scare people out of their pants but make it cool to read about it.

== Some of the subjects discussed in the book ==
Astronomical Event	Estimated Probability of Causing Death	Commentary
Asteroid impacts	1 in 700,000 in a human lifetime	May be able to prevent impact.
Solar flares	0 probability directly attributed to event	Energy from eruption may damage power grid on a global scale which may cause many deaths. Developing robust power grids may prevent massive failure.
Supernovae explosions	1 in 10,000,000	Death from ozone depletion and radiation if the supernova is less than 25 light years from Earth.
Gamma ray bursts	1 in 14,000,000	Death from radiation and ozone depletion from burst 7,000 light years away if the Earth is inside the path of the energy beam.
Heat death of the Universe	Inevitable	Any remaining objects unlikely to interact after the decay of protons and the evaporation of black holes. The estimated time scale for this era is beyond 10^{92} years.

== Reviews ==
The book has had positive reviews from Todd Dailey of Wired Magazine, Nancy Atkinson of Universe Today, and Rebecca Watson from Skepchick. It was also reviewed for Smithsonian magazine by Sarah Zielinski.

== Appearances in other media ==
In 2010 the Discovery Channel had a documentary called Phil Plait's Bad Universe. The show was based on a few chapters of the book.

George Hrab and Phil Plait recorded a song called "Death from the Skies" with lyrics based on some of the events covered in the book.
