= Phil Plait =

American astronomer, writer, and skeptic (born 1964)

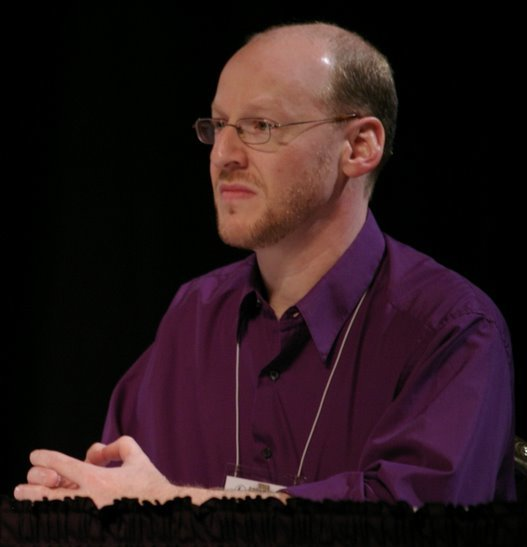
- Plait in 2007
- Born: Phillip Cary Plait; September 30, 1964 (age 62); Washington, D.C., U.S.
- Other name: Bad Astronomer
- Education: University of Michigan; University of Virginia
- Scientific career
- Fields: Physics, astronomy, science communication
- Thesis: Hubble space telescope observations of the circumstellar ring around of supernova 1987A (1995)
- Website: Bad Astronomy Newsletter (earlier posts archived on SyFy and on Slate)

Philip Cary Plait (born September 30, 1964), also known as The Bad Astronomer, is an American astronomer, skeptic, and popular science blogger. Plait has worked as part of the Hubble Space Telescope team, on images and spectra of astronomical objects, as well as on engaging in public outreach advocacy for NASA missions. He has written three books, Bad Astronomy, Death from the Skies, and Under Alien Skies. He has also appeared in several science documentaries, including How the Universe Works on the Discovery Channel. From August 2008 through 2009, he served as president of the James Randi Educational Foundation. Additionally, he wrote and hosted episodes of Crash Course Astronomy, which aired its last episode in 2016.

== Early life ==
Plait grew up in the Washington, D.C. area. He has said he became interested in astronomy when his father brought home a telescope when Plait was 5 years old or so. According to Plait, he "aimed it at Saturn that night. One look, and that was it. I was hooked."

== Education and research ==
Plait attended the University of Michigan and received his PhD in astronomy at the University of Virginia in 1995 with a thesis on supernova SN 1987A, which he studied with the Supernova Intensive Study (SINS).

During the 1990s, Plait worked with the COBE satellite and later was part of the Hubble Space Telescope team at NASA Goddard Space Flight Center, working largely on the Space Telescope Imaging Spectrograph. In 1995, he published observations of a ring of circumstellar material around SN 1987A, which led to further study of explosion mechanisms in core-collapse supernovae. Plait's work with Grady, et al. resulted in the presentation of high-resolution images of isolated stellar objects (including AB Aurigae and HD 163296) from the Hubble Space Telescope, among the first of those recorded. These results have been used in further studies into the properties and structure of dim, young, moderate-size stars, called Herbig Ae/Be stars, which also confirmed results observed by Grady, et al.

== Public outreach ==
After his research contributions, Plait concentrated on educational outreach. He went on to perform web-based public outreach for the Fermi Gamma-ray Space Telescope and other NASA-funded missions while at EdEon STEM Learning at Sonoma State University from 2000 to 2007. In 2001, he coauthored a paper on increasing accessibility of astronomy education resources and programs.

A large proportion of his public outreach occurs online. He established the badastronomy website in 1998 and the corresponding blog in 2005. The website remains archived but is no longer actively maintained, while the blog has continued, through several changes of platform, to the present day.

His first book, Bad Astronomy: Misconceptions and Misuses Revealed, from Astrology to the Moon Landing "Hoax", deals with much the same subject matter as his website. His second book, Death from the Skies, describes ways astronomical events could wipe out life on Earth and was released in October 2008.

Plait's work has also appeared in the Encyclopædia Britannica Yearbook of Science and the Future and Astronomy magazine. He is also a frequent guest on the SETI Institute's weekly science radio show Big Picture Science.

Plait has contributed to a number of television and cinema productions, either onscreen as host or guest or in an advisory role offscreen. He hosted the three-part documentary series Phil Plait's "Bad Universe" on the Discovery Channel, which first aired in the United States on August 29, 2010, but was not picked up as a series. He has appeared in numerous science documentaries and programs including How the Universe Works. Plait was a science advisor for the 2016 film Arrival and the 2017 CBS TV series Salvation. He was the head science writer of the 2017 show Bill Nye Saves the World on Netflix.

=== Scientific skeptical advocacy ===
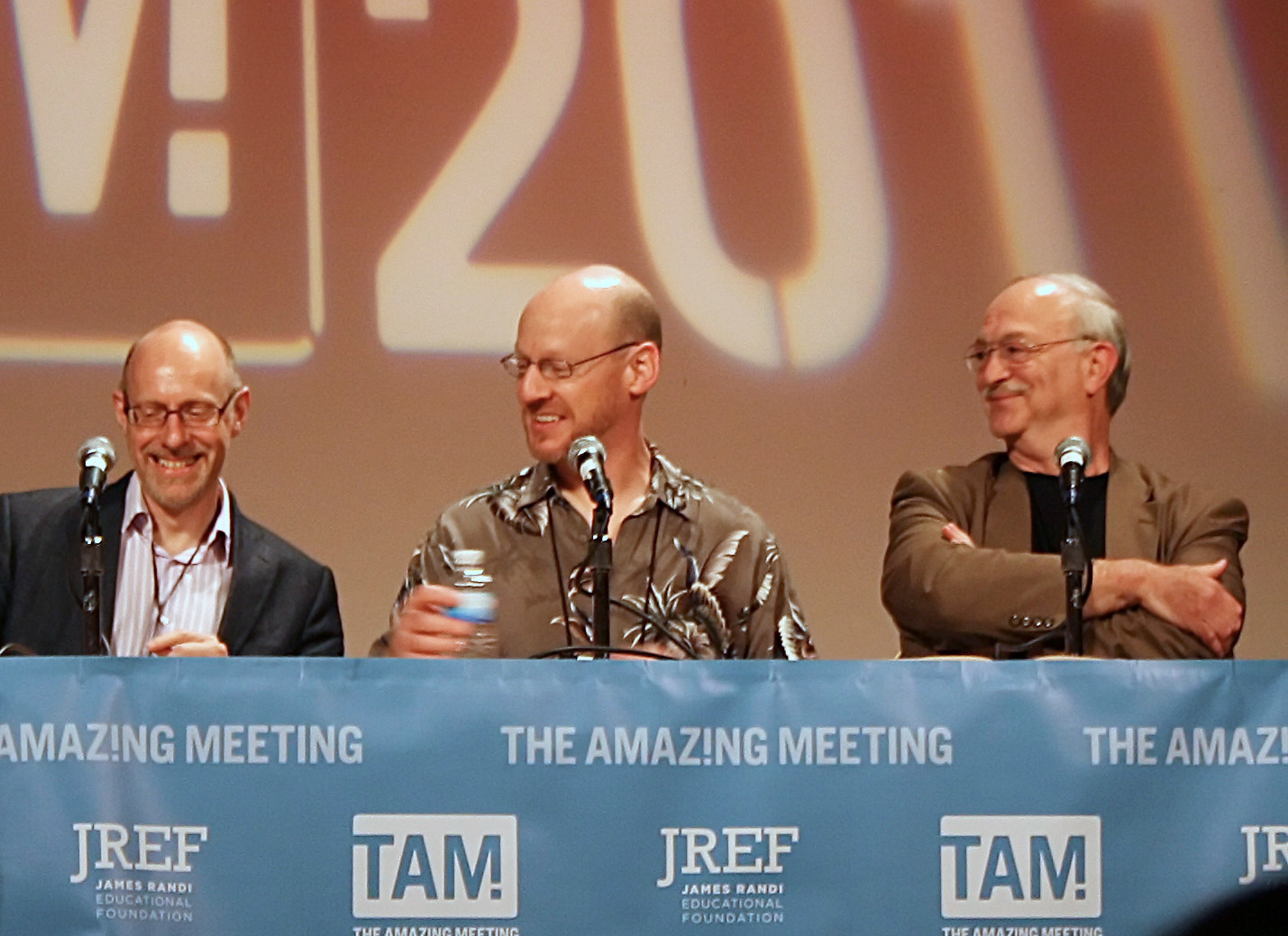
Phil Plait (center) during TAM9 in 2011, with Richard Wiseman and Joe Nickell

From 2008 to 2009, Plait served as the president of the James Randi Educational Foundation, which promotes scientific skepticism, a position he eventually stepped down from in order to focus on the "Bad Universe" television project. He has also been a regular speaker at widely attended science and skepticism events and conferences, such as The Amazing Meeting (TAM), Northeast Conference on Science and Skepticism (NECSS), and DragonCon. Plait writes and speaks on topics related to scientific skepticism, such as advocating in favor of widespread immunization.

== Personal life ==
Plait used to live in Boulder, Colorado with his wife, Marcella Setter, and daughter. In a 2009 interview, Plait stated that his daughter is interested in astronomy and science, as well as anime and manga. Between 2011 and 2018, Setter and Plait ran Science Getaways, a vacation company that provides science-based adventures. As of January 2024, he lives in rural Virginia outside of Charlottesville.

== Internet presence ==
=== Badastronomy.com ===
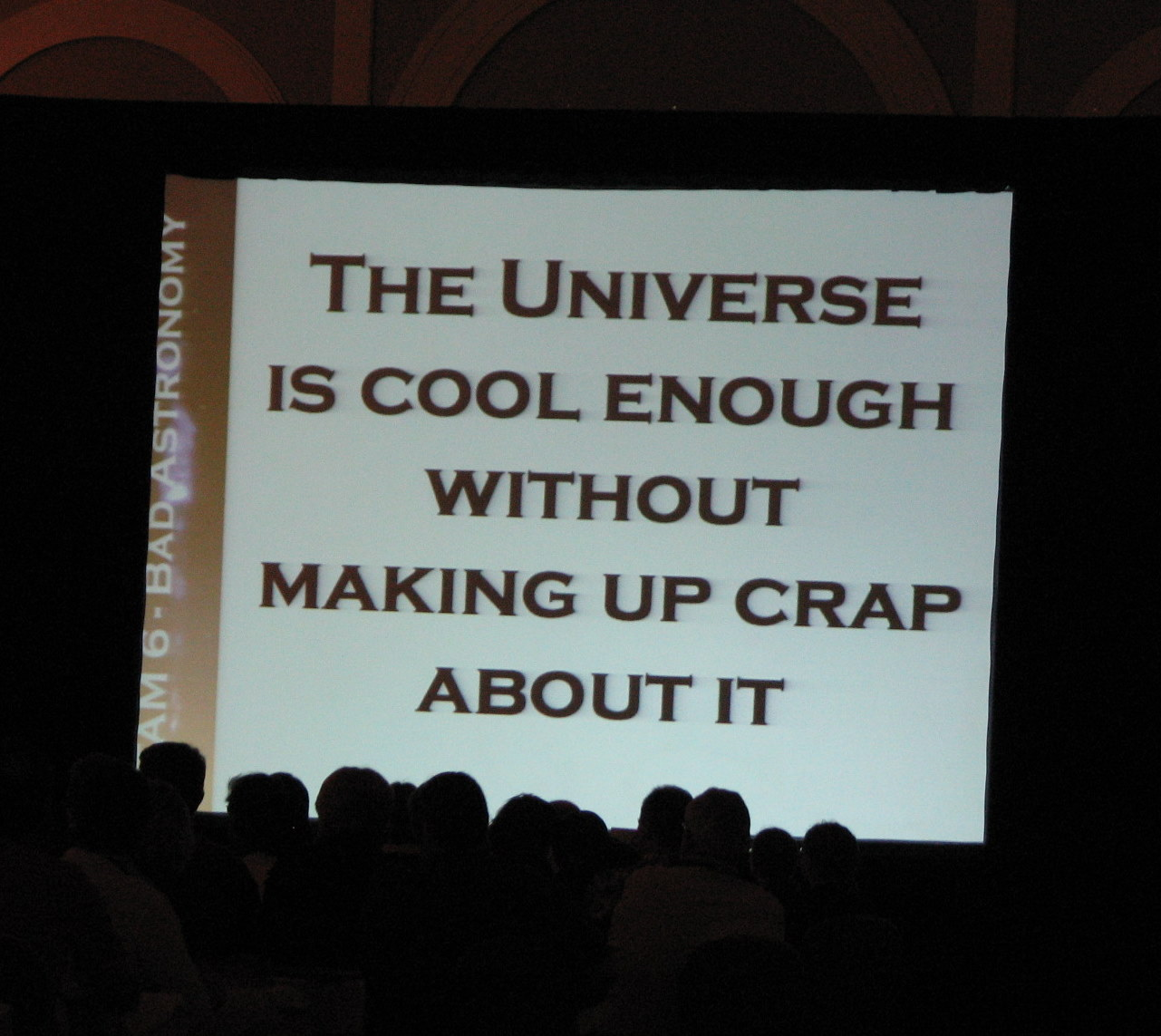
The final slide to Plait's presentation at the JREF's 6th The Amazing Meeting convention

Plait began publishing explanatory Internet postings on science in 1993. Five years later, Plait established Badastronomy.com with the goal of clearing up what he perceived to be widespread public misconceptions about astronomy and space science in movies, the news, print, and on the Internet, also providing critical analysis of several pseudoscientific theories related to space and astronomy, such as the "Planet X" cataclysm, Richard Hoagland's theories, and the Moon landing "hoax". It received a considerable amount of traffic after Plait criticized a Fox Network special accusing NASA of faking the Apollo missions. Astronomer Michelle Thaller has described Badastronomy.com, as well as Plait's book and essays called Bad Astronomy, as "a monumental service to the space-science community".

=== Blog ===
In 2005, Plait started the Bad Astronomy blog. In July 2008, it moved to a new host, Discover Magazine. While it is primarily an astronomy blog, Plait also posts about skepticism, pseudoscience, and antiscience topics, with occasional personal and political posts. On November 12, 2012, the Bad Astronomy blog moved to Slate magazine. Plait told Richard Saunders in an interview that "they [Slate] are very supportive... a new community." Revisiting old posts, Plait stated, "I've written about everything, when you've written 7,000 blog posts you've pretty much written about every topic in astronomy."

On February 1, 2017, the Bad Astronomy blog moved to SyfyWire, where it was hosted until October 2022. His blog was then hosted by Substack, and since early 2024, on beehiiv.com.

Plait has also contributed significantly to the MadSci Network, a question-and-answer Ask-A-Scientist forum.

=== Online video ===
In September 2011, Plait spoke at a TED conference in Boulder, his hometown. His conference explained how to defend Earth from asteroids.

Plait taught Astronomy on the YouTube educational series Crash Course for 47 episodes, from January 15, 2015 to February 12, 2016.

== Books ==
- Plait, Philip (2023). Under Alien Skies. Norton. ISBN 978-0-393-86730-5.
- Plait, Philip; Weinersmith, Zach (2013). 2^{7} Nerd Disses: A Significant Quantity of Disrespect. ASIN B00GI25TSC.
- Plait, Philip (2008). Death from the Skies!: These are the Ways the World Will End. Viking Press. ISBN 978-0-670-01997-7.
- Plait, Philip (2002). Bad Astronomy: Misconceptions and Misuses Revealed, from Astrology to the Moon Landing "Hoax". John Wiley & Sons. ISBN 0-471-40976-6.

== Articles ==
- Plait, Phil, "The Milky Way's Secrets: Our galaxy's night-sky spectacle sparked scientific revolutions", Scientific American, vol. 329, no. 4 (November 2023), pp. 86–87.

== Media appearances ==
Year	Program	Episode(s)	Notes
2020	Captain Disillusion: UFO on the Moon | Quick D		Video short
2019	Ancient Skies	Episodes #1-3	Mini TV series documentary
2017	How the World Ends	Episodes "Planet X"/"Aliens Invade"	TV series documentary
2015	Crash Course: Astronomy	Episodes #1-47	Short form YouTube series
2012	Curiosity	Episode #2.12 – "Sun Storms"	TV series documentary
2012	The Late Late Show with Craig Ferguson	Episode #8.122	TV series
2010–19	How the Universe Works	"Black Holes" "Stars" "Planets" "Solar Systems" "all episodes in seasons 2, 3, 4, 5, and 6"	TV series documentary
2011	Captain Disillusion: Fame Curve Collection		Video short
2010	Bad Universe	"Death Stars" "Alien Attack!" "Asteroid Apocalypse"	TV series documentary
2010	Known Universe	"Stellar Storms" "Cosmic Collisions"	TV series documentary
2008	Naked Science	"Hubble's Amazing Universe"	TV series documentary
2007	Is It Real?	"Life on Mars"	TV series documentary
2007	The Zula Patrol	"Larva or Leave Me/Egg Hunt" "There Goes the Neighborhood"	TV series
2006	Nova	"Monster of the Milky Way"	TV series documentary
2005, 2009	Penn & Teller: Bullshit!	"Conspiracy Theories" "Astrology"	TV series
2002	Die Akte Apollo		TV movie documentary

== Awards and honors ==
- The 2007 Weblog Awards – Bad Astronomy was awarded "Best Science Blog," having tied with Climate Audit.
- In March 2008, Plait had an asteroid named after him by astronomer Jeff Medkeff. Asteroid 2000 WG_{11} was named 165347 Philplait.
- In 2009, Bad Astronomy was named among Time.com's 25 Best Blogs.
- In 2013, Plait received the National Capital Area Skeptics' Philip J. Klass Award.
- In 2016, Plait was awarded the David N. Schramm Award for High Energy Astrophysics Science Journalism by the American Astronomical Society for his 2015 article entitled "A Supermassive Black Hole's Fiery and Furious Wind."
