= National Science Education Standards =

The National Science Education Standards (NSES) represent guidelines for the science education in primary and secondary schools in the United States, as established by the National Research Council in 1996. These provide a set of goals for teachers to set for their students and for administrators to provide professional development. The NSES influence various states' own science learning standards (such as the Massachusetts Frameworks), and statewide standardized testing.

== Education Reform ==
The science standards is only one of a number of reforms organized around the principles of outcomes-based education. The mathematics counterpart are the controversial NCTM standards, which also de-emphasize knowledge of disconnected facts and content in favor of context-dependent critical thinking skills and process. Progressive education seeks to reform traditional education, taking into account current understandings of human learning.

== Vision ==
The content of these standards is based heavily on a specific model of learning, constructivism (learning theory). Like reform mathematics, which is distinguished by an emphasis on building on what a child already knows and understands, the standards intend to update the methods of science education to achieve greater effectiveness with children. The goals of the standards include:

- An outline of what students need to know, understand, and be able to do
- Targets for scientific literacy at different grade levels
- All students demonstrate high levels of performance
- Teachers are empowered to make the decisions essential for effective learning
- Communities of teachers and students are focused on learning science
- Educational programs and systems nurture achievement

The intended purpose of the standards is to define teaching methods which apply to all students, regardless of age, gender, cultural or ethnic background, disabilities, aspirations, or interest and motivation in science, recognizing that different students will achieve understanding in different ways, and some students will achieve different degrees of depth and breadth of understanding depending on interest, ability, and context. However, the standards expect that all students can develop the knowledge and skills described in the standards.

The goal of scientific literacy includes inquiry, history and nature of science, personal and social perspectives of science, science, and technology, in addition to the science domains of life science, physical science, and earth and space science. Programs defined according to these standards should be developmentally appropriate, interesting, and relevant to students’ lives.

== Organization of the Standards ==
The NSES are organized into six categories:

- Standards for science teaching,
- Standards for professional development for teachers of science
- Standards for assessment in science education
- Standards for science content
- Standards for science education programs
- Standards for science education systems

== Critics ==
Many critics of standards-based education reform and reform mathematics are also critical of the emphasis of the standards on process and inquiry-based science rather than learning of facts. Science assessments such as WASL in Washington state contain very little factual content, and most assessment is based on the ability of students as young as the fifth grade to construct and interpret science experiments. By contrast, previous generations of high school and even college students were only expected to participate in, rather than design science experiments from scratch, complete with a list of materials. The principles of the standards are similar to controversial approaches taken to mathematics and language arts which de-emphasize basic skills traditionally taught in elementary school as being inappropriate to the ability level of some students. Yet content and skills that were traditionally taught at the college level, requiring "higher order" and "critical thinking" are brought down to K-12 to "raise standards".

== Notes ==
The Five Biggest Ideas in Science, Wynn & Wiggins, 1997 and cited in Understanding by Design, Wiggins and McTighe, 2005. 9.67.

== See also ==
- Constructionist learning
