= Christopher Wanjek =

American writer

Christopher Wanjek is a health and science journalist and author based in the United States.

== Biography ==
Wanjek received his bachelor's degree in journalism from Temple University and his master's degree from the Harvard School of Public Health. His most recent book, co-authored with Chris Gunn and published by The MIT Press, is Inside the Star Factory: The Creation of the James Webb Space Telescope. NASA's Largest and Most Powerful Space Observatory, which Publishers Weekly praised as "an intimate view of an astounding scientific achievement." Wanjek is also author of Bad Medicine: Misconceptions and Misuses Revealed, from Distance Healing to Vitamin O and of Food at Work: Workplace Solutions for Malnutrition, Obesity and Chronic Diseases. In 2020, Wanjek published the book Spacefarers: How Humans Will Settle the Moon, Mars, and Beyond through Harvard University Press. Among positive reviews, the work was described as "the best book ... on space exploration since Isaac Asimov" by Michael Shermer, publisher of Skeptic magazine. Food at Work, written for the International Labour Organization, has since been presented in numerous countries, largely in South America. The concept for the "Food at Work" as well as the final product has been lauded by unions and nutritionists, with emeritus professor of nutrition A. Stewart Truswell of University of Sydney describing it as "a beautifully designed, written and printed book [that] would have to be consulted by anyone advising on food at work anywhere in the world." The project has inspired government legislation to improve worker feeding programs in Mexico, Lithuania, Uruguay and elsewhere in South America.

As an astronomy writer, Wanjek worked at the National Aeronautics and Space Administration (NASA) Goddard Space Flight Center in Greenbelt, Maryland until 2007 and freelanced for astronomy magazines such Sky & Telescope and Astronomy. He currently is the "Armchair Astrophysics" columnist for the Astronomical Society of the Pacific's Mercury Magazine.

As a health writer, Wanjek wrote many stories for CBS Healthwatch and The Washington Post health section between 1999 and 2004. Since 2006 he has written a weekly column for LiveScience called Bad Medicine. In 2009 his LiveScience column criticized Pope Benedict XVI who said that condoms make the epidemic of AIDS worse.

While a student at Temple University, Wanjek was part of the Philadelphia comedy scene that produced comic Paul F. Tompkins and writer-director Adam McKay, his former housemate, among others. Wanjek has written for The Tonight Show with Jay Leno since 1998.
