= Math wars =

Debate over modern mathematics education, textbooks and curricula in the U.S.

In the United States, math wars are debates over modern mathematics education, textbooks and curricula that were triggered by the publication in 1989 of the Curriculum and Evaluation Standards for School Mathematics by the National Council of Teachers of Mathematics (NCTM) and subsequent development and widespread adoption of a new generation of mathematics curricula inspired by these standards.

While the discussion about math skills has persisted for many decades, the term "math wars" was coined by commentators such as John A. Van de Walle and David Klein. The debates focus on traditional mathematics versus reform mathematics philosophy and curricula, which differ significantly in approach and content.

== Advocates of reform ==
The largest supporter of reform in the US has been the National Council of Teachers of Mathematics. They call for a more inquiry-based approach that emphasizes real-world problem solving and understanding the underlying steps, as opposed to merely applying formulas to arrive at a correct answer. Successful implementation of this approach requires a great deal of expertise in educators; some parents and other stakeholders blame educators saying that failures occur because of this lacking expertise rather than a fundamental design flaw in the curriculum.

A backlash, which advocates call "poorly understood reform efforts" and critics call "a complete abandonment of instruction in basic mathematics," resulted in "math wars" between reform and traditional methods of mathematics education.

== Critics of reform ==
Those who disagree with the inquiry-based philosophy maintain that students must first develop computational skills before they can understand concepts of mathematics. These skills should be memorized and practiced, using time-tested traditional methods until they become automatic. Time is better spent practicing skills rather than in investigations inventing alternatives, or justifying more than one correct answer or method. In this view, estimating answers is insufficient and, in fact, is considered to be dependent on strong foundational skills. Learning abstract concepts of mathematics is perceived to depend on a solid base of knowledge of the tools of the subject.

Supporters of traditional mathematics teaching oppose excessive dependence on innovations such as calculators or new technology, such as the Logo language. Student innovation is acceptable, even welcome, as long as it is mathematically valid. Calculator use can be appropriate after number sense has developed and basic skills have been mastered. Constructivist methods which are unfamiliar to many adults, and books which lack explanations of methods or solved examples make it difficult to help with homework. Compared to worksheets that can be completed in minutes, constructivist activities can be more time-consuming. (Reform educators respond that more time is lost in reteaching poorly understood algorithms.) Emphasis on reading and writing also increases the language load for immigrant students and parents who may be unfamiliar with English.

Critics of reform point out that traditional methods are still universally and exclusively used in industry and academia. Reform educators respond that such methods are still the ultimate goal of reform mathematics, and that students need to learn flexible thinking in order to face problems they may not know a method for. Critics maintain that it is unreasonable to expect students to "discover" the standard methods through investigation, and that flexible thinking can only be developed after mastering foundational skills. Commentators have argued that there is philosophical support for the notion that "algorithmic fluency" requires the very types of cognitive activity whose promotion reform advocates often claim is their approaches' unique virtue. However, such arguments assume that reformers do not want to teach the standard algorithms, which is a common misunderstanding of the reform position.

Some curricula incorporate research by Constance Kamii and others that concluded that direct teaching of traditional algorithms is counterproductive to conceptual understanding of math. Critics have protested some of the consequences of this research. Traditional memorization methods are replaced with constructivist activities. Students who demonstrate proficiency in a standard method are asked to invent another method of arriving at the answer. Some parents have accused reform math advocates of deliberately slowing down students with greater ability in order to "paper-over" the inequalities of the American school system. Some teachers supplement such textbooks in order to teach standard methods more quickly. Some curricula do not teach long division. Critics believe the NCTM revised its standards to explicitly call for continuing instruction of standard methods, largely because of the negative response to some of these curricula (see below). College professors and employers have sometimes claimed that students that have been taught using reform curricula do not possess basic mathematical skills. One study found that, although first-grade students in 1999 with an average or above-average aptitude for math did equally well with either teacher-directed or student-centered instruction, first-grade students with mathematical difficulties did better with teacher-directed instruction.

== Reform curricula ==
Examples of reform curricula introduced in response to the 1989 NCTM standards and the reasons for initial criticism:

- Mathland (no longer offered)
- Investigations in Numbers, Data, and Space, criticized for not containing explicit instruction of the standard algorithms
- Core-Plus Mathematics Project, criticized for failing "to convey critical mathematical concepts and ideas that should and can be within reach for high school students", downplaying "algebraic structure and skills" and "inability to build geometry up from foundations in a mathematically sound and coherent way".
- Connected Mathematics, criticized for not explicitly teaching children standard algorithms, formulas or solved examples
- Everyday Mathematics, criticized for putting emphasis on non-traditional arithmetic methods.

Critics of reform textbooks say that they present concepts in a haphazard way. Critics of the reform textbooks and curricula support methods such as Singapore math, which emphasizes direct instruction of basic mathematical concepts, and Saxon math, which emphasizes frequent cumulative review.

Reform educators have responded by pointing out that research tends to show that students achieve greater conceptual understanding from standards-based curricula than traditional curricula and that these gains do not come at the expense of basic skills. In fact students tend to achieve the same procedural skill level in both types of curricula as measured by traditional standardized tests. More research is needed, but the current state of research seems to show that reform textbooks work as well as or better than traditional textbooks in helping students achieve computational competence while promoting greater conceptual understanding than traditional approaches.

== Later developments ==
In 2000 the National Council of Teachers of Mathematics (NCTM) released the Principles and Standards for School Mathematics (PSSM), which was seen as more balanced than the original 1989 Standards. This led to some calming, but not an end to the dispute. Two recent reports have led to considerably more cooling of the Math Wars. In 2006, NCTM released its Curriculum Focal Points, which was seen by many as a compromise position. In 2008, the National Mathematics Advisory Panel, created by George W. Bush, called for a halt to all extreme positions.

=== National Council of Teachers of Mathematics 2006 recommendations ===
In 2006, the NCTM released Curriculum Focal Points, a report on the topics considered central for mathematics in pre-kindergarten through eighth grade. Its inclusion of standard algorithms led editorials in newspapers like the Chicago Sun Times to state that the "NCTM council has admitted, more or less, that it goofed," and that the new report cited "inconsistency in the grade placement of mathematics topics as well as in how they are defined and what students are expected to learn." NCTM responded by insisting that it considers "Focal Points" a step in the implementation of the Standards, not a reversal of its position on teaching students to learn foundational topics with conceptual understanding. Francis Fennell, president of the NCTM, stated that there had been no change of direction or policy in the new report and said that he resented talk of "math wars". The Focal Points were one of the documents consulted to create the new national Common Core Standards, which have been adopted by most of the United States since 2010.

=== National Mathematics Advisory Panel ===
On April 18, 2006, President Bush created the National Mathematics Advisory Panel, which was modeled after the influential National Reading Panel. The National Math Panel examined and summarized the scientific evidence related to the teaching and learning of mathematics, concluding in their 2008 report, "All-encompassing recommendations that instruction should be entirely 'student centered' or 'teacher directed' are not supported by research. If such recommendations exist, they should be rescinded. If they are being considered, they should be avoided. High-quality research does not support the exclusive use of either approach." The Panel effectively called for an end to the Math Wars, concluding that research showed "conceptual understanding, computational and procedural fluency, and problem-solving skills are equally important and mutually reinforce each other. Debates regarding the relative importance of each of these components of mathematics are misguided."

The Panel's final report met with significant criticism within the mathematics education community for, among other issues, the selection criteria used to determine "high-quality" research, their comparison of extreme forms of teaching, and the amount of focus placed on algebra.

== See also ==
- Anti-racist mathematics – Educational plan meant to reduce perceived prejudice in education
- California Department of Education § 2021 mathematics framework
- Computer-based mathematics education
- Critical mathematics pedagogy – Liberation-focused math education
- David Klein (mathematician) – American mathematician
- Jo Boaler – British mathematics education professor (born 1964)
- Marian Small – Educational researcher
- Mathematics for social justice – Approach to education
- New Math – Approach to teaching mathematics in the 1950s and '60s
- Three-part lesson – Inquiry-based learning method
