= Jo Boaler =

British mathematics education professor (born 1964)

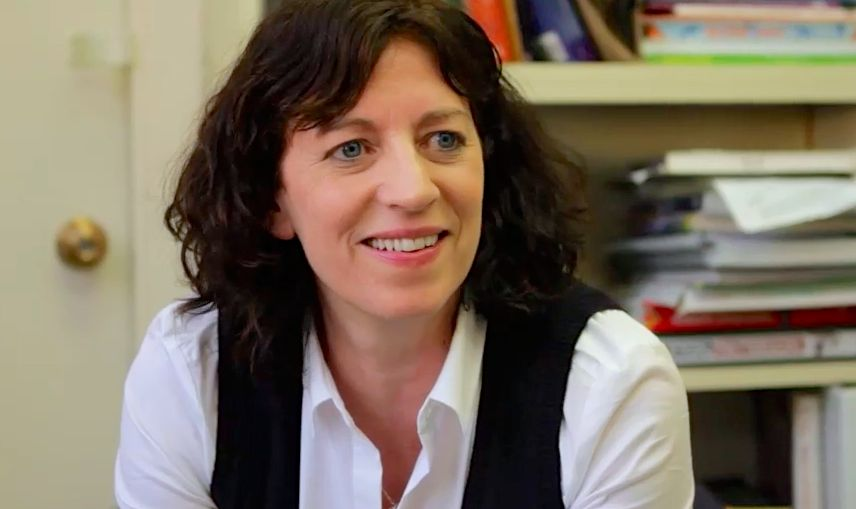
- Jo Boaler, 2013
- Born: 1964 (age 61–62); England, United Kingdom
- Education: University of Liverpool (BA); King's College London (MA, PhD)
- Scientific career
- Fields: Mathematics education
- Workplaces: Stanford University
- Doctoral advisor: Paul Black; Mike Askew

Jo Boaler (born 1964) is a British education author and Nomellini–Olivier Professor of Education at the Stanford Graduate School of Education. Boaler is involved in promoting reform mathematics and writes about equity in mathematics education. She cofounded youcubed, a Stanford research center with mathematics education resources for teachers, students and parents, and she cofounded a company that sells a math game app. She is the author, co-author or editor of eighteen mathematics books, including What's Math Got To Do With It?, The Elephant in the Classroom, Mathematical Mindsets, Limitless Mind, and Math-ish.

== Early life and education ==
Boaler grew up outside of Birmingham, England. Her mother was a secretary, and her father was a technical draftsman. Her mother attended Open University to study to become a teacher and in this way Boaler experienced "cutting-edge, play-based educational ideas of the day". Boaler said she found her early mathematics classes largely rote and procedural until one of her secondary school mathematics teachers emphasized group discussions in class.

Boaler received a bachelor's in psychology from Liverpool University in 1985. As part of initial training to become an educational psychologist, Boaler spent two years of secondary school teaching in central London at Haverstock School in Camden. After teaching experiences there inspired her to change course, Boaler received a master's degree and a PhD in mathematics education from King's College London in 1991 and 1996. She won the award for best PhD in education from the British Educational Research Association in 1997. Her PhD research compared three-year case studies of two different schools.

== Career ==
=== Emigration to the US ===
In 1998, Boaler became an assistant professor at Stanford University's Graduate School of Education. She became an associate professor in 2000 and left as a full professor in 2006.

In 2000, she obtained a National Science Foundation (NSF) grant to conduct a longitudinal study of 3 schools in California, resulting in a 2005 preprint and 2008 publication. The study compared 3 cohorts of students, one from each school, each of whom started algebra in 9th grade, but under different conditions. At the two schools the study dubbed “Greendale” and “Hilltop”, where some students took algebra 1 in 8th grade due to "tracking", the study followed a track of students who took algebra 1 in 9th grade and were offered a "traditional" curriculum. These cohorts were compared against an unspecified subset of students at "Railside" school (over an hour north of the other 2 schools) which followed a "reform" curriculum and had all students start algebra in 9th grade (detracking). Findings from the study were used to support further reform efforts.

In 2006, Stanford mathematician R. James Milgram filed a complaint of research misconduct against Boaler over various concerns about methodology and data representation. Milgram later co-authored a paper along with mathematician Wayne Bishop of California State University at Los Angeles and statistician Paul Clopton, stating that Boaler's conclusions in the Railside study were "grossly exaggerated and do not translate into success for her treatment [of] students". A report published by Stanford stated that the allegations "do not have substance" and that Boaler offered a "scientific rationale" for each of the disputed claims. Describing the complaint as a matter of "academic debate", the university declined to investigate further. In 2012, Boaler published a statement on her Stanford homepage, accusing Milgram, Bishop (and others) of harassment, persecution, and attempts to "suppress research evidence". Bishop and Milgram each issued rebuttals.

=== Return to England ===
In 2006, Boaler left Stanford for the United Kingdom. She was awarded a posting as the Marie Curie professor at Sussex University by the Marie Curie Foundation. While in England, Boaler authored two books, What's Math Got To Do With It? and The Elephant in the Classroom.

=== Return to California ===
In 2010, Boaler returned to Stanford and resumed her position as Professor of Mathematics Education. In 2012, she published articles on links between timed testing and math anxiety. In addition to focusing on inquiry-based learning, Boaler's research has highlighted problems associated with ability grouping in England and the US, and she has written about mistakes and growth mindset in the context of mathematics. In 2013, Boaler taught the first Massive Online Open Course (MOOC) on mathematics education, called "How to Learn Math", with about 40,000 teachers and parents participating, of whom about 25,000 completed the course.

In 2014, the San Francisco Unified School District reformed its math program in an effort to reduce the segregation of socio-economically disadvantaged students into lower-level math classes. The new program removed honors classes and accelerated math, placing all students into the same curriculum, and delayed the teaching of algebra until the 9th grade. Inspired by Boaler's work, classrooms were reorganized with groups of students collaborating to solve a series of math problems. Boaler met with district representatives and later praised the effort in an op-ed for The Hechinger Report.

Boaler criticized New York State's 2015 implementation of a Common Core–based math curriculum as being too focused on speed and rote learning at the expense of students' ability to think about numbers creatively.

==== Youcubed ====
In 2013, Boaler co-founded youcubed, a research center at Stanford University's Graduate School of Education, with Cathy Williams. Youcubed offers K–12 mathematics education resources to teachers, students and parents and sells professional development courses to teachers. In 2024, Boaler and youcubed partnered with Stanford's women's basketball team to use statistics to help students and players grades four through 10 improve and make decisions with data through basketball.

==== Struggly ====
Boaler is one of several cofounders of a children’s math game web app called Struggly, a brand of Boggl Inc, which is a customer of denkwerk, a consulting and digital design agency with a history of awards for design. After Struggly’s 2023 launch, Struggly and denkwerk were jointly honored with several design-related awards. Struggly was also represented by its CEO/cofounder Tanya Lamar and original cofounder Alina Schlaier to receive a community choice launch startup award at an education festival in Austin, Texas, where Struggly is headquartered.

==== California mathematics framework ====
Boaler is one of five original authors of the 2021 and 2022 drafts for the California Department of Education's 2023 Mathematics Framework, which like the older 2013 framework, provides guidance for K–12 math teaching and learning in California public schools. Boaler is also the most cited author in the framework, with it citing Boaler 48 times, in addition to citing youcubed 28 times. The final version of the framework also reflects input from educators, parents, students, and others who commented during two 60-day review periods in 2021 and 2022. The 2021 and 2022 drafts recommended delaying algebra 1 to 9th grade for all public school students, and proposed a particular data science pathway as an alternative to both the traditional algebra 2 pathway and the integrated curriculum pathways. However, the final 2023 version of the framework acknowledged that some public school students would be ready for algebra 1 in 8th grade, and it removed "alternative pathway" language for data science. After these and other changes were made by Education Trust WestEd, WestEd posted a statement of endorsement of the new framework version, with added endorsements from various organizations across California, such as Californians Together, the California Partnership for Math and Science Education, the English Learners Success Forum, the Loyola Marymount University Center for Equity for English Learners, the Partnership for Los Angeles Schools, and UnboundEd.

Before its 2023 revision, the 2021 and 2022 framework drafts by Boaler et al faced considerable criticism and pushback. For example, authors describing themselves as "a significant majority of black faculty across the UC system in fields related to data science (mathematics, statistics, and electrical engineering/computer science)" wrote an open letter expressing concerns that the proposed California Math Framework (CMF) and associated UC policy changes would cause harm to "Californian students, and especially on students of color". In addition to over 1500 signatures from other STEM experts, the letter received over 150 signatures from UC STEM faculty, including 3 UC Berkeley directors for Inclusive Practices, Outreach, and Equity & Diversity efforts in Engineering and STEM. Stanford's math department's director of undergraduate studies Brian Conrad wrote an Article for The Atlantic expressing concerns that the proposed CMF risked derailing public school math education to the extent that "only the children of families with resources beyond the public schools" would be able to access adequate high school preparation for successful STEM degrees. After several delays, a revised framework was approved in July 2023 by the state Board of Education incorporating changes recommended by WestEd.

==== Dispute over Oxnard contract ====
In 2022, Boaler was involved in a public online dispute with Jelani Nelson, a computer science professor at the University of California, Berkeley and an opponent of the 2021 mathematics framework. Nelson had retweeted a public high school teacher's screenshot from a consulting contract between Boaler and Oxnard School District, from the district's website. The retweeted contract page showed $40,000 paid to Boaler for 4 2-hour sessions (plus any preparation). Nelson's retweet criticized charging fees of this size to "large minority populations" (it was 97% non-white), given her involvement in a California math framework draft that he said "states improving math learning for black students as central and has 0 black authors". Boaler sent Nelson an email accusing him of "spreading misinformation and harassing me online" and stating that "the sharing of private details about me on social media yesterday is now being taken up by police and lawyers". Nelson posted a screenshot of Boaler's email and wrote that "Black people disagreeing with you on Twitter is not a crime". Boaler told reporters she had not intended her mention of police to be perceived as a threat, and said authorities had instead been contacted about Boaler's home address appearing on a different tweeted page of the Oxnard-website contract, not retweeted by Nelson. She also said she had received threats because of the postings. She later tweeted that Nelson was "the black male professor" who "very cleverly changed my request to meet into a claim of racism".

==== Anonymous complaint ====
In March 2024, an anonymous complaint was sent to Stanford University's dean of research alleging Boaler had violated the research policies of the University. The complaint accuses Boaler of "disregard for accuracy", documenting 52 cases in which Boaler allegedly misstated or misconstrued external studies. As with the earlier complaint from 2006, the University reviewed the complaint and decided the matter did not warrant an investigation, stating "the allegations reflect scholarly disagreement and interpretation". Boaler responded to this with an article published by Threo and the American Association of University Professors Journal: Academe, about the attempts to suppress her work and research that focuses on equitable approaches to mathematics instruction.

== Awards and honors ==
- 2000 National Science Foundation Early Career Grant
- 2014 NCSM (National Council of Supervisors of Mathematics) Kay Gilliland Equity Award
- 2016 The California Mathematics Council Walter Denham Memorial Award for Leadership
- 2019 The Nomellini–Olivier Endowed Chair and Nomellini & Olivier Professor of Education

== Publications ==
=== Books ===
- Boaler, J. (1997) Experiencing School Mathematics: Teaching Styles, Sex and Setting
- Boaler, J., editor (2000) Multiple Perspectives on Mathematics Teaching & Learning
- Boaler, J & Humphreys, C (2005) Connecting Mathematical Ideas: Middle School Cases of Teaching & Learning
- Boaler, J (2008) What’s Math Got to do With It?
- Boaler, J. (2009) The Elephant in the Classroom
- Boaler, J. (2015) Mathematical Mindsets: Unleashing Students' Potential Through Creative Math, Inspiring Messages and Innovative Teaching
- Boaler, J. (2019) Limitless Mind. Learn, Lead and Live without Barriers
- Boaler, J., Munson, J., & Williams, C. (2017–2021) K-8 Book Series. Mindset Mathematics: Visualizing and Investigating Big ideas
- Boaler, J. (2024) Math-ish: Finding Creativity, Diversity, and Meaning in Mathematics

== See also ==
- Math wars – Debate over modern mathematics education, textbooks and curricula in the U.S.
