= Three-part lesson =

Inquiry-based learning method

A three-part lesson is an inquiry-based learning method used to teach mathematics in K–12 schools. The three-part lesson has been attributed to John A. Van de Walle, a mathematician at Virginia Commonwealth University.

== Components ==
=== Getting started phase (10 to 15 minutes) ===
The purpose is to cognitively prepare students for the math lesson by having them think about a procedure, strategy or concept used in a prior lesson. Teachers determine what specific previous learning they wish students to recall, based on outcomes desired for that particular lesson. The role of the teacher is to "get students mentally prepared to work on the problem".

Marian Small, a proponent of a constructivist approach to mathematical instruction, provides an example of an inquiry-based question from which a three-part lesson could be created: "one bus has 47 students in it; another has 38. How many students are on both buses?"

=== Work phase (30 to 40 minutes) ===
Students engage in solving math problems individually, in pairs, or in small groups, and "record the mathematical thinking they used to develop solutions". Students then plan the strategies, methods, and concrete materials they will use to solve the problem. The teacher will circulate and make observations about the ways students are interacting, and will note the mathematical language they are using as well as the mathematical models they are employing to solve the problem. If a student is having difficulty, "the teacher might pose questions to provoke further thinking or have other students explain their plan for solving the problem". Teachers are advised to be active listeners in this phase, and to take notes. This is also a phase in which teachers can assess students.

=== Consolidation and practice phase (10 to 15 minutes) ===
In this final phase, the teacher oversees the sharing of solutions by students, and may employ other teaching techniques such as "math congress", "gallery walk", or "bansho". If new methods and strategies were discovered by students during the work phase, the teacher will post these on the class's "strategy wall", or use them to develop an "anchor chart". Teachers are not to evaluate students in this phase, but should be actively listening "to both good and not so good ideas".

== Effectiveness ==
Advocates of the three-part lesson state that students develop "independence and confidence by choosing the methods, strategies and concrete materials they will use, as well as ways to record their solutions". They claim students learn to discern similarities and differences in the mathematics, and also that "through such rich mathematics classroom discourse, students develop and consolidate their understanding of the learning goal of the lesson in terms of making connections to prior knowledge and experiences and making generalizations". Advocates also claim "students are more enthusiastic about the subject" when inquiry-based math instruction is used.

Opponents of inquiry-based methods such as the three-part lesson state that students are not learning the basics such as multiplication tables. In Ontario, Canada, where the Ministry of Education has promoted the three-part lesson, the curriculum was changed in the late 1990s in favour of "problem solving based on open-ended investigations rather than memorization". In that province, test scores in grades three and grade six math declined between 2009 and 2013, and "some contend that the math curriculum rather than teacher education is to blame for the lower scores because it places more emphasis on real-world concepts and applications than on rote learning".

== See also ==
- Math wars
