= Rethinking Mathematics =

2005 book by Gutstein and Peterson

Rethinking Mathematics: Teaching Social Justice by the Numbers
- Editor: Eric Gutstein and Bob Peterson
- Publication date: 2005

Rethinking Mathematics: Teaching Social Justice by the Numbers is a 2005 book (2nd edition 2013) edited by Eric Gutstein and Bob Peterson, advocating a mathematics education curriculum that intertwines mathematics with social justice. The various essays in the book, including "Home Buying While Brown or Black" and "Sweatshop Accounting", advocate using social-justice issues to motivate the teaching of rigorous mathematical concepts, and the use of mathematics education as a way of promoting ideas of social justice.

Critics derided the work as an attempt to subvert mathematics education for partisan political purposes, while the authors defended it as a useful way to motivate a wide range of students in mathematics.

== See also ==
- Critical mathematics pedagogy
- Mathematics for social justice
- Mathematics education
