= Western International School of Kenya =

- Kisumu; Kenya

Information
- Type: Private international school
- Established: 2012
- Information: +254 70 7054282/ +254 73 1770741
- Curriculum: British Curriculum
- Website: www.wiskenya.com

The Western International School of Kenya (WISK) is an international school from year 1 to 12 located on the outskirts of Kisumu, Kenya.

== Organization ==
The Western International School of Kenya is a private International school established in 2012. The school enforces no application deadlines and admits students at any time of the academic year.

== Curriculum ==
The curriculum is built on an inquiry-based philosophy. The inquiry based approach differs greatly from that of a Kenyan public school and is used by most International Schools throughout Africa and the rest of the world. Another example of inquiry based curriculum is the International Baccalaureate or the IB.

The school offers both the English and Kenya National Curriculum.

== Academic year ==
Western International School of Kenya’s academic year has three Semesters:

- Semester 1 runs from August to November.
- Semester 2 runs from December to March.
- Semester 3 runs from April to June.

== Enrolments ==
Western International School of Kenya offers rolling enrollment throughout the year as long as space is available.
