= Project Look Sharp =

Media literacy initiative

Project Look Sharp (PLS) is a media literacy initiative based at Ithaca College in Ithaca, New York. Founded in 1996, it develops educational materials and professional development programs designed to support critical thinking and media analysis in classroom settings. The organization distributes free curriculum kits and offers training for educators. Its instructional model, Constructivist Media Decoding (CMD), encourages students to examine media by evaluating source, purpose, and credibility.

== History ==
Project Look Sharp began in 1996 through collaboration between faculty and educators at Ithaca College. Initial efforts focused on schools in upstate New York before expanding nationally and internationally. The organization then developed curriculum kits and educator workshops in response to increased interest in media literacy education.

In the 2010s, PLS contributed to international initiatives, including a U.S. State Department-funded education project in Panama and a curriculum development program in Turkey.

In 2021, the group launched "Librarians as Leaders for Media Literacy" (ML3) with support from the Booth-Ferris Foundation. A 2023 grant from the Institute of Museum and Library Services funded a national expansion plan developed with the American Association of School Librarians (AASL).

== Approach ==
The organization uses a method called Constructivist Media Decoding, which engages students in analyzing media by posing structured questions about authorship, bias, and audience. This approach emphasizes inquiry-based learning over rote instruction.

The RAND Corporation included Project Look Sharp in its Truth Decay Resource Hub, citing its role in teaching media analysis skills. The journal Social Education published a case study of CMD in the context of online instruction during the COVID-19 pandemic.

CMD has been cited in several academic dissertations, teacher training materials, and peer-reviewed publications.

== Programs and curriculum ==
Project Look Sharp maintains a collection of more than 900 free downloadable lessons for K–12 and postsecondary education. These lessons cover topics such as environmental issues, historical propaganda, digital literacy, and civic engagement. The New York State Education Department lists PLS in its 2025 Media Literacy Toolkit as a recommended resource for secondary and postsecondary educators.

The organization offers training and professional development via webinars, conference sessions, and school-based workshops. The ML3 program provides media literacy leadership training for librarians and has been endorsed by groups such as AASL.

PLS materials have been included in several educator and library resource collections, and have received grant support from regional library systems.

== Recognition ==
In 2008, PLS co-founder Chris Sperry received the National Council for the Social Studies Award for Global Understanding. In 2024, co-founder Cyndy Scheibe was awarded the Elizabeth Thoman Service Award by the National Association for Media Literacy Education (NAMLE).

The organization has been profiled in education publications such as the School Library Journal for its lesson plans and strategies related to media evaluation. It has also been referenced in research published by the Erikson Institute.

== See also ==
- Media literacy
- Digital citizenship
- Critical pedagogy
- Constructivist teaching methods
