= FWL =

FWL may refer to

- Far West Laboratory for Educational Research and Development
- Far West League (1948–1951), a defunct American Minor League baseball league
- Far West League (collegiate summer baseball league)
- Florida West International Airways, an American airline
- Frisch–Waugh–Lovell theorem
- West Leederville railway station, in Australia
