= How People Learn =

Book edited by John D. Bransford, Ann L. Brown, and Rodney R. Cocking

How People Learn is the title of an educational psychology book edited by John D. Bransford, Ann L. Brown, and Rodney R. Cocking and published by the United States National Academy of Sciences' National Academies Press in 2000. The committee on How People Learn also wrote How Students Learn: History, Mathematics, and Science in the Classroom as a follow-up. An updated edition How People Learn II was released in October 2018.

The book draws the following conclusions, among others:

Learners and Learning:

- "Effective comprehension and thinking require a coherent understanding of the organizing principles in any subject matter," and
- "In-depth understanding requires detailed knowledge of the facts within a domain. The key attribute of expertise is a detailed and organized understanding of the important facts within a specific domain."

Thus, the debate within education between advocates of deep conceptual understanding and advocates of broad factual understanding misses the point. In-depth understanding is necessary to truly understand the content, but broad factual understanding is also necessary as it allows a person to remember and organize what they have learned.

Teachers and Teaching: "Teachers need expertise in both subject matter content and in teaching," and "Teachers need to develop models of their own professional development that are based on lifelong learning, rather than on an 'updating' model of learning, in order to have frameworks to guide their career planning." These conclusions have implications for teacher hiring and professional development policies.

Learning Environments:

- "Assessment and feedback are crucial for helping people learn."
- "Classroom environments can be positively influenced by opportunities to interact with... families and community members around school-based learning goals."
