= Ole Skovsmose =

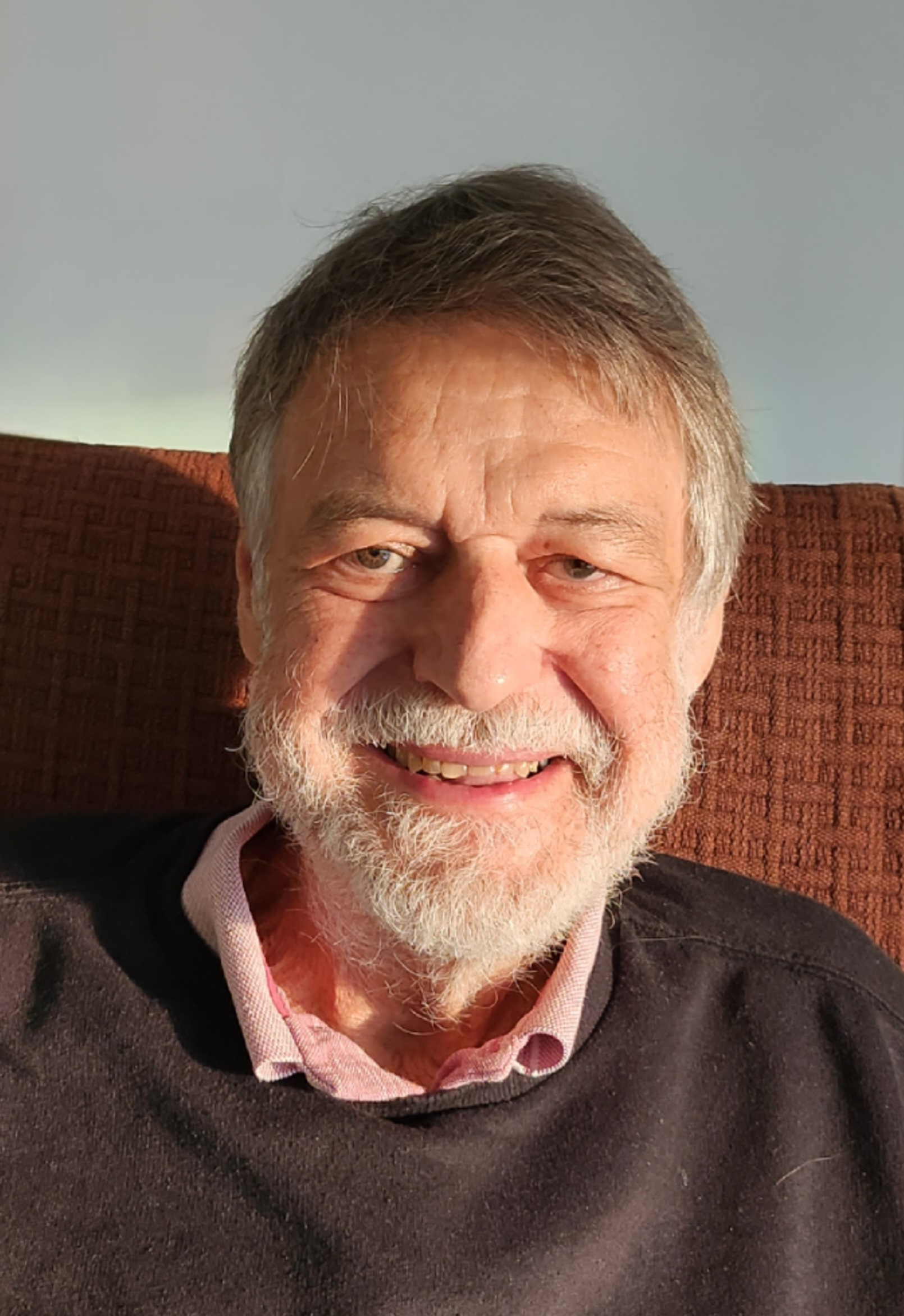
- Born: 25/06/1944; Hjørring, Denmark
- Died: 27/02/2025; São Paulo, Brazil
- Education: Aalborg University
- Scientific career
- Fields: Mathematics
- Workplaces: Aalborg University; São Paulo State University

Ole Skovsmose (1944-2025) was a Danish mathematics educator, philosopher, and artist, known for his contributions to critical mathematics education. Skovsmose was an emeritus professor at the Department of Culture and Learning at Aalborg University, Denmark, and served as a volunteer professor in the Graduate Program in Mathematics Education at the São Paulo State University (UNESP), Rio Claro campus.

== Academic contributions ==
Skovsmose’s academic work focused on the socio-political aspects of mathematics and mathematics education. His contributions have led to the development of concepts such as critical mathematics education, landscapes of investigation, and students’ foregrounds. He authored over 50 books and more than 150 scientific articles. Notable works include his collaboration with the international research group BaCoMET (Basic Components of Mathematics Education for Teachers), which included prominent figures such as Alan Bishop and Guy Brousseau. The project resulted in the book Meaning in Mathematics Education.

In recognition of his contributions, Skovsmose received the Hans Freudenthal Award in 2024 from the International Commission on Mathematical Instruction for his foundational work in critical mathematics education. His ideas have influenced academic studies worldwide, particularly in countries such as Colombia, India, Brazil, South Africa, and Germany.

Skovsmose held various academic and advisory roles. He worked at Aalborg University for 25 years, eventually becoming a full professor before assuming emeritus status.

== Books ==
- Forandringer i matematikundervisningen. Copenhagen: Gyldendal, (1980)
- Matematikundervisning og kritisk pædagogik. Copenhagen: Gyldendal, (1981)
- Alternativer i matematikundervisningen. Copenhagen: Gyldendal, (1981)
- Kritik, undervisning og matematik. Copenhagen: Lærerforeningernes Materialeudvalg, (1984)
- Teknologikritik. Herning: Systime, (1986)
- (1990). Ud over matematikken. Aarhus: Systime.
- Towards a Philosophy of Critical Mathematics Education. Dordrecht: Springer Netherlands. Kluwer Academic Publishers (1994), ISBN 978-0792329329.
- Hacia una Filosofía de la Educación Matemática Crítica. Bogotá: Una Empresa Docente, (1999)
- Connecting corners: A Greek-Danish project in mathematics education. Aarhus: Systime, (1999)
- Educação matemática crítica: A questão da democracia. Campinas: Papirus, (2001).
- Dialogue and learning in mathematics education: Intention, reflection, critique. Dordrecht: Kluwer, (2002).
- Travelling Through Education: Uncertainty, Mathematics, Responsibility. Münster: BRILL. Rotterdam: Sense Publishers (2005), ISBN 978-9077874035.
- Diálogo e aprendizagem em educação matemática. Belo Horizonte: Autêntica, (2006).
- Educação crítica: Incerteza, Matemática, Responsabilidade. São Paulo: Cortez Editora, (2007).
- Desafios da reflexão: Em educação matemática crítica. 1 Campinas: Papirus, (2008)
- In Doubt - about Language, Mathematics, Knowledge and Life-Worlds. Rotterdam: Sense Publishers. (2009). ISBN 978-9460910265.
- Matematikfilosofi. Aarhus: Systime. (2011)
- Um convite à educação matemática crítica. Campinas: Papirus, (2014)
- Foregrounds: Opaque stories about learning. Rotterdam: Sense Publishers, (2014)
- Critique as uncertainty. Charlotte: Information Age Publishing, (2014)
- Connecting humans to equations: a reinterpretation of the philosophy of mathematics. Cham: Springer. (2019), ISBN 978-3030013363.
- Critical mathematics education. Cham: Springer. (2023), ISBN 9783031262425.
- Critical philosophy of mathematics. Cham: Springer. (2024), ISBN 978-3031713743.

=== Coeditor ===
- Skovsmose, O.; Blomhøj. M. (Eds.). (2003). Kan det virkelig passe? Copenhagen: Akademisk Forlag,
- Kilpatrick, J.; HOYLES, C.; Skovsmose, O. in collaboration with Valero (Eds.). (2005). Meaning in mathematics education. New York: Springer.
- Skovsmose, O.; Blomhøj M. (Eds). (2006). Kunne det tænkes? Om matematiklæring. Copenhagen: Akademisk Forlag,
- Valero, P. ; Skovsmose, Ole (Eds.). (2012). Educación matemática crítica: Una visión sociopolítica del apendizaje y la enseñanza de las matemáticas. Bogotá: Universidad de Los Andes.

== Art work ==
In addition to his academic career, Skovsmose was an accomplished artist. His works have been exhibited in galleries and museums across Europe, North and South America, and Asia, including venues such as the Carrousel du Louvre in France and the National Historical Museum in Brazil. In 2015, he participated in the European and Latin American Biennial of Contemporary Art. Skovsmose is a member of the Association Internationale des Arts Plastiques and the Danish Association of Visual Artists. His book Saudade explores the history of his artistic projects, including Faces as Landscapes and The Four Graces.
