= Marian Small =

Educational researcher

- Born: 1948
- Known for: Educational researcher, academic, author, public speaker
- Website: www.onetwoinfinity.ca

Marian Small (born 1948) is a Canadian educational researcher, academic, author, and public speaker. She has co-authored mathematics textbooks used in Canada, Austria, and the United States, and is a proponent of a constructivist approach to mathematical instruction within K–12 classrooms.

== Career ==
Small began teaching at the University of New Brunswick's Faculty of Education in 1973. Within that faculty she served as department chair, acting associate dean, acting dean, dean, and acting vice-president.

Small served two terms on New Brunswick's School District 18.

== Approach to mathematics instruction ==
Small advocates a "constructivism" approach to mathematics instruction, which encourages students to construct explanations to math problems. "There is a strongly held belief in the mathematics education community", wrote Small, "that mathematics is best learned when students are actively engaged in constructing their own understandings. This is only likely to happen in classrooms that emphasize rich problem solving and the exchange of many approaches to mathematical situations, and that give attention to and value students’ mathematical reasoning".

To demonstrate this approach, Small provides an example of students learning to add 47 and 38. A traditional approach to math instruction would show students how to add these two numbers by "grouping the ones, trading, and then grouping the tens". Small explains that in a constructivist classroom, "the teacher might provide students with a variety of counting materials and pose a problem such as, "one bus has 47 students in it; another has 38. How many students are on both buses?" and allow students to use their own strategies to solve the problem". This would be followed by a classroom discussion where the various approaches used by students were shared and additional ideas were added.

Small's approach is enhanced by skillful questioning by the classroom teacher.

== Controversy ==
Small's style of math instruction has been described as a "random abstract approach" by those favouring more traditional skills-based pedagogy. Toronto's Globe and Mail stated: "in the latest—arguably fiercest—of the "math wars" to break out in Canada, she would be Public Enemy No. 1 for those who think kids are fast losing their number sense because of the "fuzzy-math, basic-skills-lite" teaching Dr. Small and many of her contemporaries promote".

Regarding her role in the math wars, Small has acknowledged the "concern about less emphasis on memorizing the facts and allowing calculator use" as well as the "very loud and impassioned debate on these matters". Regarding the different approaches along the continuum of math instruction, Small stated "neither is better—they are different. In fact, the more tools and approaches that we have, the more likely we are to be successful at a task".

== Publications ==
- Making Math Meaningful to Canadian Students K–8
- Big Ideas from Dr. Small K–3
- Big Ideas from Dr. Small 4–8
- Big Ideas from Dr. Small 9–12
- Good Questions: Great Ways to Differentiate Mathematics Instruction (K–8)
- More Good Questions: Great Ways to Differentiate Secondary Mathematics Instruction (9–12)
- Eyes on Math: A Visual Approach to Teaching Math Concepts (K–8)
- Leaps and Bounds 3–4, 5–6 and 7–8
- Uncomplicating Fractions
- Uncomplicating Algebra
