= AMCHA Initiative =

US non-partisan organization

- Founded: 2012
- Founders: Tammi Rossman-Benjamin and Leila Beckwith
- Type: 501(c)(3)
- Tax ID no.: 46-0774311
- Location: P.O. Box 408, Santa Cruz, California 95061
- Region served: California and the United States
- President: Tammi Rossman-Benjamin
- Revenue: $339,064 (2018)
- Expenses: $341,253 (2018)
- Website: www.amchainitiative.org

The AMCHA Initiative is a non-partisan organization aiming to combat antisemitism on campuses through investigation, documentation, and education in order to protect Jewish students from assault and fear. AMCHA was founded in 2012 by University of California Santa Cruz lecturer Tammi Rossman-Benjamin and University of California Los Angeles Professor Emeritus Leila Beckwith. The term Amcha is Hebrew for "your people" or "your nation."

== Finances ==
In 2014, The Forward wrote that AMCHA raised $200,000 in its first year and spent $100,000. In 2018 Israeli-American journalist Mairav Zonszein reviewed San Francisco Jewish Federation's tax filings. According to her review, the Federation and the Helen Diller Family Foundation has given hundreds of thousands of dollars to AMCHA in recent years. She describes AMCHA and other groups as "extremist, radical right-wing, and anti-Muslim". AMCHA is similar to Canary Mission but focuses on faculty and not on students.

Adam Milstein's Milstein Family Foundation is also one of AMCHA's donors.

== Views ==
AMCHA opposes the BDS movement, which it believes is antisemitic based on what it says are "hate-filled rhetoric and imagery intended to demonize and delegitimize Israel" BDS, which has enjoyed some success on U.S. campuses, calls for comprehensive boycotts of Israel until it stops its alleged human rights violations against the Palestinians. AMCHA therefore wants universities to adopt the State Department's definition of antisemitism which, according to AMCHA, would classify many students' pro-BDS activities as antisemitic. For example, campus protests erecting walls to symbolize the Israeli West Bank barrier and demonstrations distributing mock eviction notices to highlight Israeli house demolitions against Palestinians would both be deemed as anti-Semitic, according to AMCHA.

== Mission statement ==
AMCHA describes its mission as "investigating, documenting, educating about, and combating antisemitism at institutions of higher education in America" with the intent "to protect Jewish students from both direct and indirect assault and fear while attending colleges and universities." AMCHA also says on its website that it "is not an Israel advocacy organization, nor does it take a position on current or past Israeli government policies."

The editors of the book We Will Not Be Silenced: The Academic Repression of Israel's Critics describe the AMCHA as "a Zionist organization based in California that collaborates with other Zionist individuals and groups to suppress speech critical of Israel on university campuses across the United States. Its central tactic is to label any and all critical statements or questions about the Israeli state as "anti-Semitic".

== Publications ==
=== Reports ===
As of 2020, AMCHA has produced 15 reports which it lists on its website. Those that have been mentioned in media are:

- Bringing BDS into the Classroom, a report from 2020 which claimed that faculty who support BDS are promoting that agenda in classrooms.
- The Harassment of Jewish Students on U.S. Campuses, a report from 2019 which claimed that anti-Semitic harassment of pro-Israel students had increased by 70%, to its highest level ever.
- An annual report from 2018, which claimed that "anti-Israel harassment on college campuses in 2017 were more likely to create an antagonistic environment against Jewish students on campus than ‘classic’ anti-Semitic incidents."
- An annual report from 2017, which claimed to have uncovered a correlation between anti-Semitism and pro-BDS activism on campuses.
- Two reports in 2015 and 2016, both claimed that anti-Semitism on campuses were correlated with BDS activity.

=== AMCHA's database of antisemitism on campuses ===
AMCHA publishes a database of what it considers to be antisemitic incidents on American campuses, starting with incidents from 2015. The database and other trackers by the organization have been used by media to cite anti-Semitic activity and swastika sightings on various campuses including at Stanford University, Bowdoin College as well as across the nation.

=== Student Voices webpage ===
AMCHA maintains a webpage that lists quotes detailing the experiences of Jewish students on American campuses who have been "targeted, intimidated or frightened because they are Jewish." The quotes were collected starting in 2014. The webpage had more than 100 students, located at 47 different schools, in 20 states as of June 24, 2015. The quotes are gathered from publications nationwide including school papers.

=== List of Professors Who Publicly Endorse an Academic Boycott of Israel ===
In 2014, AMCHA began a list of professors who publicly supported the academic boycott of Israel. In criticism of this initial list, a group of 40 Jewish Studies professors signed a statement calling AMCHA's actions "deplorable". Despite the criticism, the list of continues to be updated. In 2017, Haaretz reported that the list included hundreds of names. The universities that topped the list were UC Berkeley with 47 names and UC Davis with 46. Critics feared that AMCHA's list would be used by the Israeli government to deny entry to boycott supporters.

== Campaigns ==
=== CSUN complaint about professor's website (2012–2014) ===
Over several years, AMCHA campaigned against mathematics professor David Klein at California State University Northridge (CSUN) who used the CSUN website and resources to publish information critical of Israel and pro-BDS. AMCHA submitted memos and complaints, first to CSUN administrators and later to Californian legal authorities regarding Klein's page, but the professor was found not to have violated any CSUN rules nor any law. CSUN president Dianne F. Harrison addressed the complaints in May 2012, writing: "To censor the website would be contrary to the important value of free speech and send the disturbing message that the university is willing to restrict an individual’s right to personal expression due to disagreement with those views."

=== SFSU killing colonizers stencil (2013) ===
In 2013, the General Union of Palestine Students (GUPS) and an indigenous group at San Francisco State University had set up a table at an event honoring an Edward Said memorial. At the table they had brought stencils for passersby to make signs with. One of the stencils read: "My heroes have always killed colonizers." According to AMCHA, there was also a second stencil of Leila Khaled.

AMCHA accused GUPS of "glorifying the murder of Jews" and demanded that the university must investigate and punish the students. The university released a statement supportive of AMCHA's charges, stating that "celebrating violence or promoting intolerance, bigotry, antisemitism or any other form of hate mongering" would not be tolerated at SFSU. But following a public outcry, the university issued a second statement underscoring "that social justice is a strategic priority and our commitment to free speech runs deep."

=== SFSU threatening Tumblr posts (2013) ===
In 2013, AMCHA Initiative uncovered threatening Tumblr posts by the President of GUPS at SFSU. One was a photo of the student holding a knife, with the caption: "I love this blade. ... it makes me want to stab an Israeli soldier." Another was of an Israeli soldier with the caption "the only 'peace' I'm interested in is the head of this f**cking scum on a plate, as well as the heads of all others like her, and all others who support the IDF."

AMCHA forwarded the material to the university and the police. In February 2014, university officials announced that the student had withdrawn from the university before the spring semester had begun on January 23 and that he was no longer enrolled nor living in campus housing.

=== SFSU Complaint about scholar's trip (2014) ===
On March 6, 2014, San Francisco State University (SFSU) Professor Rabab Abdulhadi held a campus event to discuss with students what she had learned from a trip funded by the university to Palestine and Jordan. The purpose of the trip had been to attend an international conference and to network, research, and collaborate with potential university partners in Palestine. The day before Abdulhadi's campus event, AMCHA sent a letter to university president Leslie Wong, claiming that the event would "contribute to a hostile environment for Jewish students." On March 26, AMCHA sent another letter, claiming that following the event, observers had seen Jewish students "in tears."

AMCHA Initiative co-founder Tammi Rossman-Benjamin also accused Abdulhadi of having defrauded the state of California: "We believe that there was some fraud going on in order to get the money, approval, insurance, she essentially defrauded the state and the taxpayers of California." Her primary complaint was that Abdulhadi had met with the controversial Islamic preacher Raed Salah and Leila Khaled. She therefore coordinated a letter from eight pro-Israel organizations to the university administration demanding an investigation into the matter. Abdulhadi defended herself by noting that on the trip they met with 198 individuals from 89 organizations and that dialogue with controversial figures was an important part of academia.

The university reviewed the records for Abdulhadi's travel and issued a statement in June dismissing the allegations as meritless. The statement underscored that "Abdulhadi’s academic work in race and resistance studies requires examination of some of the world’s most challenging and controversial issues" and that the university "will not censor our scholars nor condone censorship by others." Dissatisfied, AMCHA and seven other pro-Israeli organizations (Brandeis Center, Institute for Black Solidarity with Israel, Proclaiming Justice to the Nations, Scholars for Peace in the Middle East, Simon Wiesenthal Center, StandWithUs, and the Zionist Organization of America) recited the allegations against Abdulhadi in a June 24 letter addressed to the California State Controller but the Controller's office dismissed the complaint.

On June 25, 2014, the Dean of the College of Ethnic Studies of SFSU, in a public statement on the university website, while recognizing their right to free expression, strongly criticized the AMCHA initiative saying that it had "developed a reputation for misrepresentation of facts against individuals and institutions." and admonishing them for "their continued ill intent and propaganda style tactics" and recommending "that AMCHA cease its bullying and encourage it to find a more productive, collegial and humane manner with which to express its political views without sensationalism, vitriol or malice."

=== UCLA opposition to pledge against sponsored Israel-trips (2014) ===
In 2014 Students for Justice in Palestine and allied groups at UCLA asked candidates for student government positions to pledge to not go on trips to Israel sponsored by AIPAC, the Anti-Defamation League, or Hasbara Fellowships.

In response, AMCHA Initiative organized a letter with six other organizations condemning the pledge as an "outrageous and impermissible violation of students’ right to free expression, their right to free association and their fundamental right to travel and move freely." The letter was delivered to the UC Board of Regents, University President Janet Napolitano and Chancellor Gene Block. Soon thereafter, Block and Napolitano condemned the pledge and asked the VP of Student Affairs to intervene.

=== UC events featuring Omar Barghouti (2014) ===
In mid-January 2014, the co-founder of BDS, Omar Barghouti, was scheduled to speak at three UC schools; UCLA, UC Riverside, and UC Davis. AMCHA alleged that sponsoring Barghouti's presentations violated UC policies and state law. UC leadership responded by stating that they were not in support of a boycott of Israel, but considered Barghouti's presentations to be free speech.

In a meeting with the UC Board of Regents following Barghouti's speaking arrangements, Tammi-Benjamin alleged that the three events included "appalling anti-Semitic statements."

=== UC Berkeley course on Palestine (2016) ===
In 2016, AMCHA led a campaign involving 43 Jewish and pro-Israel organizations in opposing a student-led course titled "Ethnic Studies 198: Palestine: A Settler Colonial Analysis." AMCHA alleged that the course was "political indoctrination" and that the guest speakers were "politically motivated, meet our government's criteria for antisemitism, and are intended to indoctrinate students to hate the Jewish state and take action to eliminate it." Jonathan Greenblatt of the Anti-Defamation League joined in on the criticism and called the course a "travesty" and "distortion of history." One fierce critic, professor emeritus Abraham H. Miller of the Haym Salomon Center, called the course faculty sponsor, Hatem Bazian, "a street orator whose disgust with America is such that he called for an American Intifada."

The campaign was initially successful and the course was suspended. University Chancellor Nicholas Dirks wrote:

The facilitator for the course in question did not comply with policies and procedures that govern the normal academic review and approval of proposed courses for the Decal program. As a result, the proposed course did not receive a sufficient degree of scrutiny to ensure that the syllabus met Berkeley’s academic standards before it was opened for enrollment to students. ... For that reason, approval for the course has been suspended pending completion of the mandated review and approval process.

But following criticism from Palestine Legal and other pro-Palestinian organizations the University reinstated the course.

=== UC linking anti-Zionism to antisemitism (2015–2016) ===
AMCHA led a year-long lobbying campaign, uniting over 50 pro-Israeli organizations, to get UC to label anti-Zionism as a form of antisemitism. On March 22, 2016, the Regents of UC passed a Statement of Principles Against Intolerance which included the statement, "Anti-Semitism, anti-Semitic forms of anti-Zionism and other forms of discrimination have no place at the University of California." In the Regents report “Principles Against Intolerance,"

“Expressions of anti-Semitism are more coded and difficult to identify....In particular, opposition to Zionism is often expressed in ways that are not simply statements of disagreement over politics and policy, but also assertions of prejudice and intolerance toward Jewish people and culture.”

Rossman-Benjamin celebrated the statement, calling it huge," while critics condemned it. Dima Khalidi, the director of Palestine Legal, said that pro-Israeli groups had "succeeded in convincing the regents that Palestine advocacy is inherently anti-Semitic, and should be condemned."

=== Campaign against the academic boycott of Israel (2018–2019) ===
AMCHA Initiative launched a campaign involving more than 100 Jewish pro-Israel organizations to get American education-leaders to sign a letter voicing their opposition to BDS. In response to the campaign, on December 13, 2019, all ten UC Chancellors signed onto a statement that reaffirmed their opposition to the academic boycott of Israel.

=== Campaign against Zoom event with terrorist organization (2020) ===
In 2020, San Francisco State University professors Rabab Abdulhadi and Tomomi Kinukawa organized an event called "Whose Narratives? Gender, Justice and Resistance: A Conversation with Leila Khaled". Khaled is a convicted terrorist barred from entering several countries, a member of the Popular Front for the Liberation of Palestine which is a designated terrorist organizations in several countries including the United States. AMCHA wrote a letter of protest against the event, joined by 86 other organizations, stating that Abdulhadi "foments a divisive and toxic atmosphere, both inside and outside the classroom, that incites hatred and harm towards Jewish and pro-Israel students; and seriously erodes the public trust in your university to uphold its academic mission and ensure the safety and well-being of all of its students". Zoom Video Communications cancelled the event, saying that it is "committed to supporting the open exchange of ideas and conversations, subject to certain limitations contained in our Terms of Service, including those related to user compliance with applicable U.S. export control, sanctions and anti-terrorism laws". Zoom, in particular, said that Khaled's "reported affiliation or membership in a U.S. designated foreign terrorist organization" violated its terms of use.

== Criticism ==
The AMCHA has been accused of "conflating" anti-Semitism with "condemnation of Israel". On June 25, 2014, the Dean of the College of Ethnic Studies of SFSU issued a public statement on the university website, accusing the group of having "developed a reputation for misrepresentation of facts against individuals and institutions...continued ill intent and propaganda style tactics". The dean also demanded that the group ceases its "bullying" and find a "more productive, collegial and humane manner" to express its political views without "sensationalism, vitriol or malice", while recognizing their right to free expression.

In October 2014, a group of purported Jewish studies professors wrote in The Forward:

Its technique of monitoring lectures, symposia and conferences strains the basic principle of academic freedom on which the American university is built, ... Moreover, its definition of anti-Semitism is so undiscriminating as to be meaningless. Instead of encouraging openness through its efforts, AMCHA’s approach closes off all but the most narrow intellectual directions and has a chilling effect on research and teaching. AMCHA’s methods lend little support to Israel, whose very survival depends on free, open, and vigorous debate about its future. ... AMCHA’s tactics are designed to stifle debate on issues debated in Israel and around the world, and the presumption that students must be protected from their own universities is misguided and destructive. Efforts such as these do not promote academic integrity, but rather serve to deaden the kind of spirited academic exchange that is the lifeblood of the university.

== See also ==
- Public diplomacy of Israel
