= U.S. National Institute of Education =

The U.S. National Institute of Education (NIE) was established in the Education Division, Department of Health, Education, and Welfare by an act of June 23, 1972 (86 Stat. 327). On May 4, 1980, it was transferred to the Office of Educational Research and Improvement, United States Department of Education, by the Department of Education Organization Act (3 Stat. 678), approved October 17, 1979. The Institute provided leadership in the conduct and support of scientific inquiry into the educational process. Among the studies it sponsored was the Beginning Teacher Evaluation Study. It was abolished in 1985 with functions dispersed among the Center for Statistics, the Information Service, and the Office of Research, all within the Office of Educational Research and Improvement (OERI).

On November 5, 2002, President Bush signed into PUBLIC LAW 107–279 (116 Stat. 1940) the Education Sciences Reform Act. The act produced the Institute of Education Sciences organization and abolished the Office of Educational Research and Improvement. The OERI website content is considered out-of-date with all content dated December 4, 2002 or prior. An archive was still available at http://www2.ed.gov/offices/OERI/ as of March 2011. However, visitors to the OERI website information were directed to visit http://www.ed.gov/offices/IES/ for up-to-date on the Institute of Education Sciences and its programs.
