= Mathematics for social justice =

Approach to education

Mathematics for social justice is a pedagogical approach to mathematics education that seeks to incorporate lessons from critical mathematics pedagogy and similar educational philosophies into the teaching of mathematics at schools and colleges. The approach tries to empower students on their way to developing a positive mathematics identity and becoming active, numerically literate citizens who can navigate and participate in society. Mathematics for social justice puts particular emphasis on overcoming social inequalities. Its proponents, for example, Bob Moses, may understand numerical literacy as a civil right. Many of the founders of the movement, e.g. Eric Gutstein, were initially mathematics teachers, but the movement has since expanded to include the teaching of mathematics at colleges and universities. Their educational approach is influenced by earlier critical pedagogy advocates such as Paulo Freire and others. Mathematics for social justice has been criticised, however, its proponents argue that it both fits into existing teaching frameworks and promotes students' success in mathematics.

Mathematics for social justice often overlaps with other approaches to mathematics education, the practice and research of mathematics, including ethics in mathematics and ethnomathematics. Common to these approaches is that they can be understood as a sociopolitical turn in mathematics.

== Criticism ==
Pedagogical approaches incorporating issues of social justice into mathematics classrooms have been heavily criticised by some mathematicians and educators. They argue that mathematics is neutral and that its education and research should be separated from issues of social justice. Balancing the requirements of a mathematical education that teaches students mathematical skills and social justice can be difficult. Some of its opponents use this to argue against mathematics for social justice because it would necessarily come at the expense of teaching mathematical knowledge.

Eric Gutstein's book Rethinking Mathematics has been said to calculate controversy and to unnecessarily bring partisan politics into mathematics. The criticism is shared with other works in this area.

== See also ==
- Critical mathematics pedagogy
- Rethinking Mathematics
- Ethics in mathematics
- Critical pedagogy
- Ethnomathematics
- Mathematical sociology
