= Far West Laboratory for Educational Research and Development =

American think tank

The Far West Laboratory for Educational Research and Development (FWL) was established in 1966, as one of the 20 original Regional Educational Laboratories funded by the United States Congress and charged with "bridging the gap between research and practice."

Between 1966 and 1976, FWL developed teacher "minicourses" on a variety of subjects. Each minicourse provided a model of specific classroom strategies or behaviors, gave teachers a chance to practice the strategies, and then provided feedback. Minicourses were distributed throughout the country, and the approach was adapted for use in other professions beyond K–12 education.

Between 1976 and 1986, FWL's landmark Beginning Teacher Evaluation Study funded by the U.S. National Institute of Education identified teacher characteristics and skills that contribute positively to student performance. The study focused national attention on "Academic Learning Time", a concept soon picked up and extended by countless other researchers and educators.

Between 1986 and 1995, FWL developed teacher cases to improve teacher education and effectiveness in the classroom. The lab's work in this area was on the cutting edge of what has been called a "quiet revolution in teacher education." In 1995 FWL merged with the Southwest Regional Educational Laboratory (SWRL) to form WestEd.
