= List of school districts numbered 18 =

School District 18 may refer to, among other things:

== United States ==
- Wells-Ogunquit Community School District 18, in Maine
- Garden City Union Free School District 18, in New York
- Plainedge Union Free School District, in New York
- Blue Ridge Community Unit School District 18, in Illinois
- Fairmount School District 18, in Wyoming
- Apache County School District No. 18, in Arizona
- Cochise County School District No. 18, in Arizona
- Greenlee County School District No. 18, in Arizona

== Canada ==
- Black Gold Regional Division No. 18, in Alberta
- New Brunswick School District 18
- School District 18 Golden, in British Columbia
