= WestEd =

San Francisco-based nonprofit organization

- Type: Nonprofit
- Headquarters: 730 Harrison Street San Francisco, California
- CEO: Jannelle Kubinec

WestEd is a San Francisco-based nonprofit organization. The organization's mission states, "WestEd, a research, development, and services agency, works with education and other communities to promote excellence, achieve equity, and improve learning for children, youth, and adults."

In 2013, WestEd's annual revenue was approximately $137 million, with over 530 clients and funders including the United States Department of Education, National Science Foundation, the United States Department of Justice, and many state, county, local, philanthropic, and business entities. WestEd has been vetted and approved as a qualified service provider in the following federal contracting programs: the U.S. Department of Health and Human Services Program Support Center (PSC) Task Order Contracts, and the General Service Administration's Mission Oriented Business Integrated Services (MOBIS) Schedule (SIN 874-1: Integrated Consulting Services).

WestEd conducts various services – consulting and technical assistance, evaluation, policy, professional development, and research and development – aimed at supporting and improving education and human development. WestEd’s work is focused in several key areas: college and career; early childhood development and learning; English language learners; health, safety, and well-being; literacy; schools, districts, and state education systems; science, technology, engineering, and mathematics; special education; standards, assessment, and accountability; and teachers and leaders.

== Governance and legal status ==
WestEd is a joint powers authority, authorized by a California Joint Powers Agreement and governed by public entities in Arizona, California, Nevada, and Utah, with board members representing agencies from these states and nationally, including leaders from public and private education, business, and human services communities. Its board takes an active role in agency leadership and strategic planning.

A nonprofit, public research and development agency, WestEd is tax exempt under Section 115(1) of the Internal Revenue Code, and, as such, meets the giving guidelines of philanthropic organizations.

== History ==
WestEd was formed in 1995 when the Southwest Regional Educational Laboratory (SWRL), located in Los Alamitos, California, merged with the Far West Laboratory for Educational Research and Development (FWL), located in San Francisco. SWRL and FWL were established in 1966, shortly after the passage of the Elementary and Secondary Education Act (ESEA) (Pub.L. 89-10, 79 Stat. 27, 20 U.S.C. ch.70), a United States federal statute enacted April 11, 1965. The Act funded several areas of primary and secondary education including professional development, instructional materials, resources to support educational programs, and parental involvement promotion. FWL and SWRL were established under ESEA (1965) Title IV, which established funding for educational research and training.

== Research and technical assistance centers ==
WestEd operates several federal research and technical assistance centers.

=== Regional Educational Laboratory West ===
The United States Department of Education Regional Educational Laboratory (REL) Program is a network of ten laboratories.

WestEd was awarded the contract to operate the Regional Educational Laboratory (REL) West (serving Arizona, California, Nevada, and Utah) for the current period, running from January 2012 through the end of 2016. Under the current contract, REL West partners with regional educators to form research alliances dedicated to addressing regional needs and increasing the use of data and evidence in education decision-making.

WestEd has operated REL West since the REL Program's inception in 1966. In the previous contract cycle (2006–2011), REL West published over 30 peer-reviewed studies and held 36 technical assistance events bridging research, policy, and practice, with well over 2,000 participants.

=== Other federal centers ===
WestEd is also the prime contractor operating four other Comprehensive Centers: the West Comprehensive Center, which serves Arizona, Nevada, and Utah; the Mid-Atlantic Comprehensive Center, which serves Delaware, Maryland, New Jersey, Pennsylvania, and the District of Columbia; the Center on School Turnaround; and the Center on Standards and Assessment Implementation.

WestEd is a subcontractor on six other regional Comprehensive Centers — performing program tasks for the Central Comprehensive Center, Northeast Comprehensive Center, and South Central Comprehensive Center, and performing evaluations for the Great Lakes Comprehensive Center, Midwest Comprehensive Center, and Pacific Regional Comprehensive Center.

In addition, WestEd is the prime contractor for the Northeast Regional Resource Center, which serves Connecticut, Massachusetts, Maine, New Hampshire, New Jersey, New York, Rhode Island, and Vermont. WestEd also conducts research for the Regional Educational Laboratory Northeast and Islands, administered by Education Development Center, Inc. and serving New England, New York, Puerto Rico, and the United States Virgin Islands.

== Programs and services ==
WestEd is organized into several programs that provide research, technical assistance, and services in order to "create positive, innovative, and sustainable improvements in education and human development." WestEd works with a range of clients at the state and local level, and is an approved service provider with several state departments of education, including the Arizona Department of Education, Colorado Department of Education, Hawaii Department of Education, Massachusetts Department of Elementary and Secondary Education, Tennessee Department of Education, and Washington State Office of Superintendent of Public Instruction. Numerous school districts throughout the country have also selected WestEd as an approved service provider, including Baltimore City Public Schools, New York City Board of Education, Oakland Unified School District, Tucson Unified School District, and Vail School District.

=== Reading Apprenticeship ===
WestEd's Reading Apprenticeship program is a research-based instructional framework that is supposed to improve the teaching effectiveness of content-area middle and high school teachers, literacy coaches, and teacher educators. The approach helps adolescent students become more confident, engaged, and strategic readers.

In 2010, WestEd received a federal Investing in Innovation (i3) grant to address the persistent academic achievement gaps in the nation's high schools by scaling up the Reading Apprenticeship model of academic literacy instruction. This collaborative effort is providing research-based, discipline-focused professional development to 2,800 high school of biology, U.S. history, and English language arts; and is reaching more than 400,000 students in 300 schools. In 2013, WestEd received another i3 grant from the U.S. Department of Education to adapt a rigorously researched face-to-face Reading Apprenticeship professional development model into an alternative web-based model for high school science teachers: Internet-Based Reading Apprenticeship Improving Science Education (iRAISE). During the three-year grant period, 150 teachers and 33,000 students will be impacted by the iRAISE professional development.

The first Reading Apprenticeship study was conducted in 1996–1997 in one San Francisco public high school. Students gained an average of two years growth in seven months of instruction measured on a standardized reading comprehension test, while engaging in rigorous, academic work rather than remediation focused on basic skills. The program tenets and the results were published in the book, Reading for Understanding (San Francisco: Jossey-Bass), which recently had its second edition published. In 2005, a randomized controlled study of the efficacy of reading apprenticeship professional development for high school history and science teaching and learning was funded by the Institute of Education Sciences, National Center for Education Research.

In 2008, the Enhanced Reading Opportunities Study, also funded by the Institute for Education Sciences, reported that Reading Apprenticeship Academic Literacy had a positive and statistically significant impact on reading comprehension test scores (0.14 standard deviation; p-value = 0.015). The 2010 Final Report of the Enhanced Reading Opportunities Study indicated, "Overall, the findings from these reports show that over the course of ninth grade, the ERO programs [Reading Apprenticeship Academic Literacy and Xtreme Reading] improved students’ reading comprehension skills and helped them perform better academically in their high school course work."

=== Program for Infant/Toddler Care ===
The Program for Infant/Toddler Care (PITC), developed collaboratively by WestEd and the California Department of Education Child Development Division, is a comprehensive training system used in multiple states that promotes responsive, caring relationships for infants and toddlers. Its centerpiece is a series of broadcast quality videos/DVDs in English, Spanish, and Chinese (Cantonese), with accompanying video magazines, guides, and trainer's manuals available in both English and Spanish. The materials are organized into four training modules, based on the latest research and practice. A complementary program, Beginning Together, ensures that children with special needs are incorporated, and appropriate inclusive practices are promoted, in the training and technical assistance provided by PITC. This is accomplished through "training-of-trainers" institutes, regional outreach activities, training materials, and demonstration programs. In addition, the California Map to Inclusive Child Care project provides a statewide system of support, information and resources for families and providers to facilitate barrier–free access to inclusive child care for children birth to 21.

PITC worked with the Administration for Children, Youth, and Families to develop the Early Head Start program, and has presented training institutes and technical assistance for more than 500 programs serving families with children from birth to three. PITC staff have worked with representatives of 19 states, and over 7,500 trainers, college faculty, and program directors have attended PITC training modules since 1990. In 2002, the National Center for Children in Poverty selected PITC as a model initiative to support infants, toddlers, and their families. The Center for Child and Family Studies and the University of Cincinnati are codeveloping an online associate degree program for early Head Start teachers.

=== Making Sense of SCIENCE ===
Making Sense of SCIENCE (formerly "Understanding Science") is a nationally field-tested professional development program that helps teachers learn major concepts of K-8 science, examine how children make sense of those concepts, and analyze and improve their science teaching. Making Sense of SCIENCE professional development modules help teachers actively learn science in combination with student thinking and teaching. Each module focuses on cases of actual classroom practice that illustrate students’ science ideas and highlight an important teaching dilemma, one that any teacher might face. Teachers engage in hands-on science activities that parallel those of students in the cases, examine student work, and critically analyze classic instructional activities and decisions.

In 2005, the Institute of Education Sciences, National Center for Education Research funded the development of three teacher professional development courses in the Making Sense of SCIENCE series that address challenging physical science and earth science topics: heat and energy, plate tectonics, and climate and weather. This development grant includes three small, randomized controlled studies to assess the potential efficacy of each of these courses separately to improve teacher content knowledge and student learning, and the reduction of the science achievement gap between English learners and English-proficient speakers. A fourth study will assess the potential efficacy of the entire sequence of courses on teacher knowledge and student science achievement. In 2009 the Institute of Education Sciences funded a randomized-cluster experimental design study, Impact of the Making Sense of SCIENCE Professional Development Model on Science Achievement of English Language Learner Students, to evaluate the effects of WestEd's Making Sense of SCIENCE model of professional development — an approach that emphasizes inquiry-based instruction practices that depend less on English proficiency, textbook knowledge, and direct instruction — on student achievement in science, especially English language learner students. The National Science Foundation has funded a large-scale study, Learning Science for Teaching: Effects of Content-Rich and Practice-Based Professional Development Models on Teacher Content Knowledge, Classroom Practice, and Student Learning, examining the effects of promising professional development models on teachers, classrooms, and students.

== See also ==
- Education in the United States
- Educational research
- Educational evaluation
- Teacher education
- Early childhood education
- Public Policy
