= How Students Learn =

2001 educational psychology book

How Students Learn: History, Mathematics, and Science in the Classroom is the title of a 2001 educational psychology book edited by M. Suzanne Donovan and John D. Bransford and published by the United States National Academy of Sciences's National Academies Press.

The book focuses on "three fundamental and well-established principles of learning that are highlighted in How People Learn and are particularly important for teachers to understand and be able to incorporate in their teaching:

1. "Students come to the classroom with preconceptions about how the world works. If their initial understanding is not engaged, they may fail to grasp the new concepts and information, or they may learn them for purposes of a test but revert to their preconceptions outside the classroom.
2. "To develop competence in an area of inquiry, students must (a) have a deep foundation of factual knowledge, (b) understand the facts and ideas in the context of a conceptual framework, and (c) organize knowledge in ways that facilitate retrieval and application.
3. "A 'metacognitive' approach to instruction can help students learn to take control of their own learning by defining learning goals and monitoring their progress in achieving them."
