= Critical mathematics pedagogy =

Liberation-focused math education

Critical mathematics pedagogy is an approach to mathematics education that includes a practical and philosophical commitment to liberation. Approaches that involve critical mathematics pedagogy give special attention to the social, political, cultural and economic contexts of oppression, as they can be understood through mathematics. They also analyze the role that mathematics plays in producing and maintaining potentially oppressive social, political, cultural or economic structures. Finally, critical mathematics pedagogy demands that critique is connected to action promoting more just and equitable social, political or economic reform.

Critical mathematics pedagogy builds on critical theory developed in the post-Marxist Frankfurt School, as well as critical pedagogy developed out of critical theory by Brazilian educator and educational theorist Paulo Freire. Definitions of critical mathematics pedagogy and critical mathematics education differ among those who practice it and write about it in their work. The focus of critical mathematics pedagogy shifts between three core tenets, but always includes some attention to all three: (1) analysis of injustice and inequitable relations of power made possible through mathematics, (2) critiques of the ways in which mathematics is used to structure and maintain power, and (3) critiques toward plans of action for change and the use of mathematics to reveal and oppose injustices, as well as imagine proposals for more equitable and just relations.

== Core concepts and foundations ==
=== Critical theory and critical mathematics ===
Those who build their critical mathematics pedagogy with close relations to critical theory, focus on the analysis of mathematics as having "formatting power" that shapes the way we understand and organize the world. The assumption underlying critical mathematics pedagogy that comes from critical theory is the notion that mathematics is not neutral. According to critical mathematics, neither mathematics itself nor the teaching or learning of mathematics can be value-neutral, or free of interpretation. The critical mathematics group (est. 1990), one of the first groups of teachers and researchers to convene around the work of critical mathematics, state that mathematics is (1) knowledge constructed by humans, (2) the set of knowledges constructed by all groups of humans, not only the Eurocentric knowledge traditionally included in academic texts and (3) a human enterprise in which understanding results from action in social, cultural, political and economic context.

Marilyn Frankenstein, the first educator to coin the term critical mathematics pedagogy in the United States in her 1983 article "Critical Mathematics Pedagogy: An Application of Paulo Freire's Epistemology," illustrates one way in which mathematics is not neutral using the example of the world map. She explains that in order to represent a three-dimensional object on a two dimensional surface, such as is necessary when mapping the earth, map-makers must make decisions about which types of distortions to allow. For example, the most traditionally accepted and commonly used world map is the Mercator map which enlarges the size of Europe and shrinks the size of Africa - a side-effect of the way it works (to assist navigation). This representation can be read to suggest that certain parts of the world are larger, and therefore more important or more powerful than others via the (inaccurate) size comparison presented in the map.

Ole Skovsmose's first publication on critical mathematics pedagogy in Europe coincided with Marilyn Frankenstein's in the United States. It refers to "mathemacy" which would parallel critical literacy for mathematics. He explains that "mathematics colonizes part of reality and reorders it." Therefore, "the goal of mathematics education should be to understand the formatting power of mathematics and to empower people to examine this formatting power so they will not be controlled by it." According to him, mathemacy would consist of three components (1) mathematical knowing, or the skills developed in traditional mathematics classrooms, (2) technological knowing, or the ability to build models with mathematics and (3) reflective knowing, or competency in evaluating applications of mathematics. It is specifically the third component that makes this approach to mathematical literacy a critical one.

Bülent Avcı, through classroom-based participatory action research, in his recent book, Critical Mathematics Education: Can Democratic Education Survive under Neoliberal Regime?, re-conceptualizes Critical Mathematics Education as a bottom-up response to the top-down imposed market-driven implementations and neoliberal hegemony in education. In this context, Bülent Avcı offers rich ethnographic data to redefine concepts such as dialogic pedagogy, collaborative learning, and inquiry-based mathematics education in order to promote justice-based critical citizenship and participatory democracy. In that he distinguishes these concepts from neoliberal pedagogy. Bülent Avcı simultaneously draws on the ideas of Paulo Freire and Jurgen Habermas to develop a unique approach to Critical Mathematics Education.

=== Critical pedagogy and critical mathematics pedagogy ===
Those who build their critical mathematics pedagogy out of critical pedagogy focus on empowerment of the learners as experts and actors for change in their own world. Critical mathematics pedagogy demands that students and teachers use mathematics to understand "relations of power, resource inequalities between different social groups and explicit discrimination" in order to take action for change. Paulo Freire (1921–1997), Brazilian educator and educational theorist, commonly regarded as the originator of critical pedagogy, suggests that most teaching happens in a "banking" model where teachers hold the information and students are assumed to be passive receptacles for that knowledge. Freire's alternative to the banking method is a "problem-posing" model of education. Through this model students and teachers participate together in a mutually humanizing process of dialogue. With the support of their teacher, students examine problems from their own lives and work collaboratively to generate solutions. One goal of critical pedagogy, according to Freire, is to develop critical consciousness or conscientização (Portuguese). Both teachers and students are expected to challenge their own "well-established ways of thinking that frequently limit their own potential" and that of others. They are especially expected to challenge those ways of thinking that might reproduce instead of challenge oppressive ways of thinking and being. This commitment to learning and critique for the purpose of action for change is also known as praxis, the intersection of theory and practice, another core tenet of the critical pedagogy of Paulo Freire.

Marilyn Frankenstien argues that "most current uses of mathematics support hegemonic ideologies." In particular, she focuses on the mathematical science of statistics which supports the unquestioned acceptance of uncertain conclusions. She argues that the use of the banking model in mathematics education (memorization and procedural focus) produces "math anxiety" in many people, especially and disproportionately those in non-dominant groups (women, people of color, lower income students). This math anxiety then leads people to "not probe the mathematical mystifications" that drive industrial society.

Eric (Rico) Gutstein applies Freire's notion of the inherent connection between "reading the word and the world" to mathematical literacy. He suggests that teaching mathematics for social justice involves both reading the world with mathematics, or more explicitly, "using mathematics to understand relations of power, resource inequalities between different social groups and explicit discrimination," as well as writing the world with mathematics, or developing the tools of social agency in young people for acting in their own worlds. Mathematical literacy according to Gutstein must include both the capacity to "read the mathematical world," necessary for traditional academic and economic success, as well as the capacity to "read the world with mathematics," meaning the use of mathematics to understand and interrogate potentially problematic or unjust structures in their own lives.

== Critical mathematics pedagogy in action ==
Because critical mathematics pedagogy is designed to be responsive to the lives of the students in a given classroom and their local context, there is no set curriculum. Some educators re-use lessons or units from year to year that may apply to multiple groups of students, while other educators develop projects that respond directly to the concerns of a particular group of students, building a project together around a problem the students have posed. Precisely for this reason it is pertinent to consider a few examples of what critical mathematics pedagogy might look like in action.

William Tate, critical race theorist and promoter of culturally relevant teaching, describes the work of one teacher who brought together many of the core components of critical mathematics pedagogy. This teacher elicited concerns from her students about their own neighborhood and lives, and found out that one concern was the prevalence of liquor stores in the neighborhood. Students were being harassed on their way to and from school, having to step over or walk past drunk individuals, making them feel uncomfortable and unsafe. This teacher led her students through the process of in-depth research to better understand the distribution of liquor licenses and the reasons behind the concentration in their neighborhood. The class then met with local journalists to discuss the use of different types of graphic for representing statistics to the general public. The class then considered and determined which graphics and statistical representations (decimals, fractions, percents) might be the strongest for communicating their findings. Finally, the students used their research to produce a policy solution which they presented to the local community council. The work of this group of students and their teacher succeeded in leading to the closing of two of the nearby liquor stores in the neighborhood.

Ole Skovsmose describes a classroom in Denmark in which students learned about the use of algorithms for distribution of welfare support to families by attempting to create their own algorithms. The class worked in groups, where each group came up with a family profile to serve under the supervision of the instructor. Groups then were given a budget for welfare distributions to families and had to come up with how to distribute the money among all the families in their "town" made up of all the created family profiles. The task led them to develop ways of categorizing people in families by age, and families type, by income amount and type, by labor and employment, by possible productivity to society, and more. Some groups distributed the money without building a distribution algorithm, using trial and error and attempting to balance the distribution by more intuitive means. Others built algorithms, working backwards, attempting to break down the distribution using percentages. Many groups were surprised to find that their algorithms did not function comprehensively, and did not fully distribute the amount they were budgeted, and that the outcomes by group were vastly different. Perhaps more importantly, students gained an awareness of the choices and decision making that goes into how policies such as welfare for families are complex and human-created, not simply existing structures. This project is an example of the way in which critical mathematics pedagogy can reveal the role that humans play in mathematizing the world. It is different from Tate's example because it does not explicitly include an action component.

Shelly M. Jones teaches Mathematics Education at Central Connecticut State University. Her classes address culturally relevant mathematics, where she explains cognitively demanding mathematics skills from a relevant cultural perspective.

For a collection of sample lessons that address mathematics teaching through a critical lens see the book, Rethinking Mathematics: Teaching Social Justice by the Numbers (Eds. Gutstein and Peterson, 2005).

== Related concepts ==
Other work in the field of mathematics education that often overlaps at least in part with critical mathematics pedagogy includes the work of ethnomathematics, culturally relevant teaching in mathematics, and work for educational equity in mathematics.

The concept of ethnomathematics was introduced by D'Ambrosio in 1978, in response to the reliance on Eurocentric models for academic mathematics teaching to the exclusion of other cultural models. The goal of work in ethnomathematics is to de-center mathematics as a European dominated discipline by contributing research and teaching that highlights the contributions of many different cultures to mathematics as a discipline, and validating a wide range of mathematical practices. Ethnomathematics work notices, recognizes, reclaims, and celebrates the ways in which non-European communities and cultures are now and have throughout their histories been creating, using, and innovating with mathematics. It differs from critical mathematics pedagogy in that its focus is on cultural and social aspects of mathematics, where critical mathematics work also includes an explicit focus on politics and power structures. Though differences exist, those who work in either field oftentimes publish in similar publications and both consider their work mathematics for social justice.

Culturally relevant teaching in mathematics was developed initially to support the success of African-American students, frequently poorly served by the American public school system which has a long history of educational inequality. The liquor store example provided above is shared by Tate as an example of culturally relevant teaching, but might likewise be seen to embody the tenets of critical pedagogy. He cites six core practices of the teacher from the example that make her work culturally relevant: (1) communication between students, teacher, and outside entities, (2) cooperative group work, (3) investigative research throughout the learning process, (4) questioning content, people, and institutions, (5) open-ended problem solving connected to student realities, and (6) social action. While the practices listed by Tate resonate profoundly with those of critical mathematics pedagogy, the difference (if there is any) is in the goals of the two approaches. The focus of culturally relevant teaching is on the empowerment and liberation of a cultural or racial group, whereas the goals of critical pedagogy include empowerment and liberation of individuals as well as groups, in the face of any form of oppression, not only cultural or racial oppression.

The notion of educational equity in mathematics education promotes the provision of high quality mathematics education to all groups and individuals in an attempt to narrow achievement gaps, for example gaps related to race and gender. This approach does not include a critical approach to mathematics itself, or the notion that mathematics education should include the learning of mathematics for the purpose of being able to analyze and change structures of power and injustice in the world. The National Council of Teachers of Mathematics, the world's largest mathematics education organization, has placed equity as one of its top priorities. However, critical mathematics educators suggest that the NCTM standards "fail to define equity in applicable terms for classroom teachers, and it overemphasized the economic aspects of equity."

== Challenges and critiques ==
Logistically, implementation of critical pedagogy is a challenge because there is and can be no "how-to recipe." If the curriculum must be built out of students’ lives then it will necessarily change each year and with each group of students.

Critiques are widespread, suggesting that mathematics is unbiased and not bound to culture, society or politics and therefore should not be wrongly politicized in the classroom. It is argued that this politicization is a distraction from achievement and risks holding students back, most specifically those it purports to support.

== See also ==
- Anti-bias curriculum
- Critical literacy
- Critical pedagogy
- Critical theory
- Ethnomathematics
- Mathematics education

== Bibliography ==
- Frankenstein, M. (1983). Critical Mathematics Education: An Application of Paulo Freire’s Epistemology. The Journal of Education, 165(4), 315–339.
- Powell, A. (2012). The historical development of criticalmathematics education. In Teaching Mathematics for Social Justice: Conversations with Educators. Eds. Anita Wager & Stinson, D. Reston, VA: National Council of Teachers of Mathematics.
- Skovsmose, O. (1994). Towards a critical mathematics education. Educational Studies in Mathematics, 27(1), 35–57. http://doi.org/10.1007/BF01284527
- Stinson, D. & Wager, A. (2012). A sojourn into the empowering uncertainties of teaching and learning mathematics for social change. In Teaching Mathematics for Social Justice: Conversations with Educators. Eds. Anita Wager & Stinson, D. Reston, VA: National Council of Teachers of Mathematics.
- Tate, W. F. (1995). Returning to the Root: A Culturally Relevant Approach to Mathematics Pedagogy. Theory into Practice, 34(3), 166–173.
- Tutak, F. A., Bondy, E., & Adams, T. L. (2011). Critical pedagogy for critical mathematics education. International Journal of Mathematics Education in Science and Technology, 42(1), 65–74. http://doi.org/10.1080/0020739X.2010.510221
- Avcı, B. (2018). Critical Mathematics Education: Can Democratic Mathematics Education Survive under Neoliberal Regime?. Boston, USA: Brill-Sense.
