= Constructivist teaching methods =

Teaching method based on constructivism

Constructivist teaching is based on constructivism. It rests on the belief that learning occurs as learners are actively involved in a process of meaning and knowledge construction, as opposed to passively receiving information.

== History ==
Constructivist teaching methods are based on constructivist learning theory. The origins of this approach have been traced to the philosophies of Immanuel Kant, George Berkeley, and Jean Piaget. There are those who also cite the contribution of John Dewey such as his works on action research, which allows the construction of complex understanding of teaching and learning.

Dewey and Piaget researched childhood development and education; both were highly influential in shaping informal education. Dewey's idea of influential education suggests that education must engage and expand exploration, thinking, and reflection in the role of educators. In contrast, Piaget argued that we learn by expanding our knowledge through experiences generated through play from infancy to adulthood, which are necessary for learning. Both theories are now encompassed by the broader movement of progressive education. Constructivist learning theory states that learners construct knowledge from what they already know. As such, children should not be treated as blank slates; they make sense of classroom material in the context of their current knowledge.

The development of constructivist models of teaching has been attributed to the works of Maria Montessori, which were further developed by more recent theorists such as David A. Kolb and Ronald Fry, among others. These theorists have proposed sensory and activity-based learning methods. Kolb and Fry developed a methodology for experiential learning that involves concrete experience, observation and reflection, forming abstract concepts, and testing in new situations.

== Activities ==
The constructivist method comprises at least five stages: inviting ideas, exploration, proposition, explanation and solution, and taking action. The constructivist classroom also focuses on daily activities when it comes to student work. Teaching methods also emphasize communication and social skills, as well as intellectual collaboration. This is different from a traditional classroom where students primarily work alone, learning through repetition and lecture. Activities encouraged in constructivist classrooms include:

- Experimentation: Students individually perform an experiment and then come together as a class to discuss the results.
- Research projects: Students research a topic and can present their findings to the class.
- Field trips: These allow students to put the concepts and ideas discussed in class into a real-world context. Field trips are often followed by class discussions.
- Films: These provide visual context and thus bring another sense into the learning experience.
- Class discussions: This technique is used in all of the methods described above. It is one of the most important distinctions of constructivist teaching methods.
- Campus wikis: These provide learners with a platform for curating helpful learning resources.

Constructivist approaches can also be used in online learning. Tools such as discussion forums, wikis and blogs can enable learners to actively construct knowledge. Because existing knowledge schemata are explicitly acknowledged as a starting point for new learning, constructivist approaches tend to validate individual and cultural differences and diversity.

== Assessment ==
Traditional testing is only one facet of constructivist assessment of student success. Assessment also consists of a personal, thorough interpretation of students' performance in the context of their out-of-school life. Non-traditional constructivist assessment strategies include:

- Oral discussions: The teacher presents students with a "focus" question and allows an open discussion on the topic.
- KWL(H) Chart (What we know, What we want to know, What we have learned, How we know it). This technique can be used throughout the course of study for a particular topic, but it is also a good assessment technique because it shows the teacher the student's progress throughout the course of study.
- Mind Mapping: In this activity, students list and categorize the concepts and ideas relating to a topic.
- Hands-on activities: These encourage students to manipulate their environments or a particular learning tool. Teachers can use a checklist and observation to assess student success with the particular material.
- Pre-testing: This allows a teacher to determine what knowledge students bring to a new topic and thus will be helpful in directing the course of study.

== Arguments against constructivist teaching techniques ==
Critics have voiced the following arguments against constructivist-based teaching instruction:

- A group of cognitive scientists has also questioned the central claims of constructivism, saying that they are either misleading or contradict known findings.
- One possible deterrent for this teaching method is that, due to the emphasis on group work, the ideas of the more active students may dominate the group's conclusions.

While proponents of constructivism argue that constructivist students perform better than their peers when tested on higher-order reasoning, the critics of constructivism argue that this teaching technique forces students to "reinvent the wheel". Supporters counter that "Students do not reinvent the wheel but, rather, attempt to understand how it turns, how it functions." Proponents argue that students — especially elementary school-aged children — are naturally curious about the world, and giving them the tools to explore it in a guided manner will serve to give them a stronger understanding of it.

Mayer (2004) developed a literature review spanning fifty years and concluded "The research in this brief review shows that the formula constructivism = hands-on activity is a formula for educational disaster." He argues that active learning is often suggested by those subscribing to this philosophy. In developing this instruction, these educators produce materials that require learning to be behaviorally active and not be "cognitively active". That is, although they are engaged in activity, they may not be learning (Sweller, 1988). Mayer recommends using guided discovery, a mix of direct instruction and hands-on activity, rather than pure discovery: "In many ways, guided discovery appears to offer the best method for promoting constructivist learning."

Kirchner et al. (2006) agree with the basic premise of constructivism, that learners construct knowledge, but are concerned with the instructional design recommendations of this theoretical framework. "The constructivist description of learning is accurate, but the instructional consequences suggested by constructivists do not necessarily follow." (Kirschner, Sweller, and Clark, 2006, p. 78). Specifically, they say instructors often design unguided instruction that relies on the learner to "discover or construct essential information for themselves" (Kirchner et al., 2006, p75).

For this reason they state that it "is easy to agree with Mayer's (2004) recommendation that we "move educational reform efforts from the fuzzy and nonproductive world of ideology—which sometimes hides under the various banners of constructivism—to the sharp and productive world of theory-based research on how people learn" (p. 18). Finally Kirschner, Sweller, and Clark (2006) cite Mayer to conclude fifty years of empirical results do not support unguided instruction.

== Specific approaches ==
Specific approaches to education that are based on constructivism include the following:

=== Constructionism ===
An approach to learning based on the constructivist learning ideologies presented by Jean Piaget (Harel & Papert, 1991). In this approach, the individual is consciously engaged in the construction of a product (Li, Cheng, & Liu, 2013). The utilization of constructionism in educational settings has been shown to promote higher-order thinking skills such as problem-solving and critical thinking (Li et al., 2013).

=== Guided instruction ===
A learning approach in which the educator uses strategically placed prompts, cues, questions, direct explanations, and modeling to guide student thinking and facilitate an increased responsibility for the completion of a task.

=== Problem-based learning ===
A structured educational approach which consists of large and small group discussions. Problem-based learning begins with an educator presenting a series of carefully constructed problems or issues to small groups of students. The problems or issues typically pertain to phenomena or events to which students possess limited prior knowledge. The first component of problem-based learning is to discuss prior knowledge and ask questions related to the specific problems or issues. Following the class discussion, there is typically time in which students individually research or reflect on the newly acquired information and/or seek out areas requiring further exploration. After a pre-determined amount of time (as outlined by the educator), students will meet in the same small groups that were composed prior to the class discussion. In the first meeting, groups will spend between one and three hours further discussing the problems or issues from class in addition to presenting any new information collected during individual research. Following the first meeting, students will independently reflect on the group discussion, specifically in comparing thoughts regarding the problems or issues in question. Typically, groups will meet a second time to critically analyse individual and group thoughts and discussions and will attempt to synthesize the information in order to draw conclusions about the given problem or issue. Within the educational setting, problem-based learning has enabled students to actively construct individual understandings of a topic using both prior and newly acquired knowledge. Moreover, students also develop self-directed and group learning skills which ultimately facilitates the comprehension of the problems or issues (Schmidt & Loyens, 2007).

==== Inquiry-based learning ====
An educational approach associated with problem-based learning in which the student learns through investigating issues or scenarios (Hakverdi-Can & Sonmez, 2012). In this approach, students pose and answer questions individually and/or collaboratively in order to draw conclusions regarding the specific issues or scenarios (Hakverdi-Can & Sonmez, 2012). Within the educational setting, inquiry-based learning has been beneficial in developing student inquiry, investigation, and collaboration skills, in turn, increasing overall comprehension of the issue or scenario (Hakverdi-Can & Sonmez, 2012).

Effective essential questions include student thought and research, connect to student's reality and can be solved in different ways (Crane, 2009). There are no incorrect answers to essential questions, rather answers reveal student understanding(Crane, 2009).

==== Anchored instruction ====
An educational approach associated with problem-based learning in which the educator introduces an 'anchor' or theme in which students will be able to explore (Kariuki & Duran, 2004). The 'anchor' acts as a focal point for the entire task, allowing students to identify, define, and explore problems while exploring the topic from a variety of different perspectives (Kariuki & Duran, 2004).

=== Cooperative learning ===
A variety of educational approaches focusing on individuals working together to achieve a specific learning outcome (Hsiung, 2012).

==== Reciprocal Peer Teaching ====
A cooperative learning approach wherein students alternate roles as teacher and learner (Krych, March, Bryan, Peake, Wojciech, & Carmichael, 2005). The utilization of Reciprocal Peer Teaching (RPT) in educational settings has been effective in the development of teamwork, leadership, and communication skills in addition to improving students' understanding of course content (Krych et al., 2005).

==== Jigsaw ====
A highly structured cooperative learning approach which is implemented in four stages: introduction, focused exploration, reporting and re-shaping, and integration and evaluation. In the introduction stage, the class is divided into heterogeneous 'home' groups consisting of between three and seven students. Upon establishing the 'home' groups, the teacher will discuss the subtopics pertaining to the subject matter. In the focused exploration stage, each student within all 'home' groups selects one of the subtopics. Students from each 'home' group that have selected the same subtopic will form a 'jigsaw' group. It is in the 'jigsaw' group that students will explore the material pertaining to the subtopic and will prepare for teaching it to their 'home' group, the reporting and re-shaping stage. The approach concludes in the fourth stage, integration and evaluation, wherein each of the 'home' groups combine the learning of each subtopic together to create the completed piece of work

== See also ==
- Constructivism in science education
- Constructivist epistemology
- Marian Small
- Montessori method
