= Inquiry-based learning =

Form of active learning

Inquiry-based learning (also spelled as enquiry-based learning in British English) (Note: The UK dictionaries Collins and Longman list the spelling "inquiry" first, and Oxford simply calls it another spelling, without labeling it as US English.) is a form of active learning that starts by posing questions, problems or scenarios. It contrasts with traditional education, which generally relies on the teacher presenting facts and their knowledge about the subject. Inquiry-based learning is often assisted by a facilitator rather than a lecturer. Inquirers will identify and research issues and questions to develop knowledge or solutions. Inquiry-based learning includes problem-based learning, and is generally used in small-scale investigations and projects, as well as research. The inquiry-based instruction is principally very closely related to the development and practice of thinking and problem-solving skills.

== History ==
Inquiry-based learning is primarily a pedagogical method, developed during the discovery learning movement of the 1960s as a response to traditional forms of instruction—where people were required to memorize information from instructional materials, such as direct instruction and rote learning. The philosophy of inquiry based learning finds its antecedents in constructivist learning theories, such as the work of Piaget, Dewey, Vygotsky, and Freire among others, and can be considered a constructivist philosophy. Generating information and making meaning of it based on personal or societal experience is referred to as constructivism. Dewey's experiential learning pedagogy (that is, learning through experiences) comprises the learner actively participating in personal or authentic experiences to make meaning from it. Inquiry can be conducted through experiential learning because inquiry values the same concepts, which include engaging with the content/material in questioning, as well as investigating and collaborating to make meaning. Vygotsky approached constructivism as learning from an experience that is influenced by society and the facilitator. The meaning constructed from an experience can be concluded as an individual or within a group.

In the 1960s Joseph Schwab called for inquiry to be divided into three distinct levels. This was later formalized by Marshall Herron in 1971, who developed the Herron Scale to evaluate the amount of inquiry within a particular lab exercise. Since then, there have been a number of revisions proposed and inquiry can take various forms. There is a spectrum of inquiry-based teaching methods available.

Inquiry learning has been used as a teaching and learning tool for thousands of years, however, the use of inquiry within public education has a much briefer history. Ancient Greek and Roman educational philosophies focused much more on the art of agricultural and domestic skills for the middle class and oratory for the wealthy upper class. It was not until the Enlightenment, or the Age of Reason, during the late 17th and 18th century that the subject of Science was considered a respectable academic body of knowledge. Up until the 1900s the study of science within education had a primary focus on memorizing and organizing facts.

John Dewey, a well-known philosopher of education at the beginning of the 20th century, was the first to criticize the fact that science education was not taught in a way to develop young scientific thinkers. Dewey proposed that science should be taught as a process and way of thinking – not as a subject with facts to be memorized. While Dewey was the first to draw attention to this issue, much of the reform within science education followed the lifelong work and efforts of Joseph Schwab. Joseph Schwab was an educator who proposed that science did not need to be a process for identifying stable truths about the world that we live in, but rather science could be a flexible and multi-directional inquiry driven process of thinking and learning. Schwab believed that science in the classroom should more closely reflect the work of practicing scientists. Schwab developed three levels of open inquiry that align with the breakdown of inquiry processes that we see today.

1. Students are provided with questions, methods and materials and are challenged to discover relationships between variables
2. Students are provided with a question, however, the method for research is up to the students to develop
3. Phenomena are proposed but students must develop their own questions and method for research to discover relationships among variables

The graduated levels of scientific inquiry outlined by Schwab demonstrate that students need to develop thinking skills and strategies prior to being exposed to higher levels of inquiry. Effectively, these skills need to be scaffolded by the teacher or instructor until students are able to develop questions, methods, and conclusions on their own.

== Characteristics ==
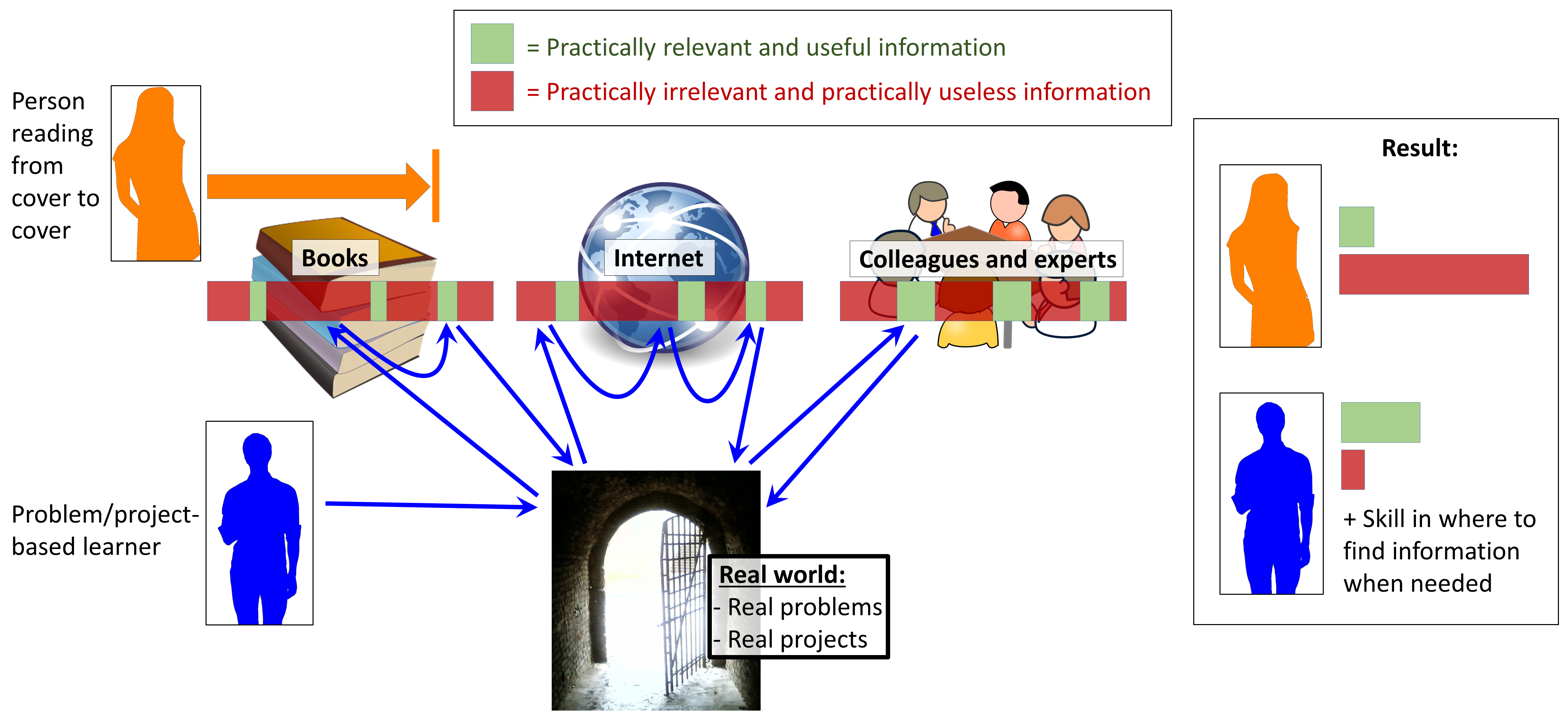
Example of problem/project based learning versus reading cover to cover. The problem/project based learner may memorize a smaller amount of total information due to spending time searching for the optimal information across various sources, but will likely learn more useful items for real world scenarios, and will likely be better at knowing where to find information when needed.

Specific learning processes that people engage in during inquiry-learning include:

- Creating questions of their own
- Obtaining supporting evidence to answer the question(s)
- Explaining the evidence collected
- Connecting the explanation to the knowledge obtained from the investigative process
- Creating an argument and justification for the explanation

Inquiry learning involves developing questions, making observations, doing research to find out what information is already recorded, developing methods for experiments, developing instruments for data collection, collecting, analyzing, and interpreting data, outlining possible explanations and creating predictions for future study.

=== Levels ===
There are many different explanations for inquiry teaching and learning and the various levels of inquiry that can exist within those contexts. The article titled The Many Levels of Inquiry by Heather Banchi and Randy Bell (2008) outlines four levels of inquiry.

Level 1: Confirmation inquiry
The teacher has taught a particular science theme or topic. The teacher then develops questions and a procedure that guides students through an activity where the results are already known. This method can be used to reinforce concepts taught and to introduce students into learning to follow procedures, collect and record data correctly and to confirm and deepen understandings.

Level 2: Structured inquiry
The teacher provides the initial question and an outline of the procedure. Students are to formulate explanations of their findings through evaluating and analyzing the data that they collect.

Level 3: Guided inquiry
The teacher provides only the research question for the students. The students are responsible for designing and following their own procedures to test that question and then communicate their results and findings.

Level 4: Open/true inquiry
Students formulate their own research question(s), design and follow through with a developed procedure, and communicate their findings and results. This type of inquiry is often seen in science fair contexts where students drive their own investigative questions.

Banchi and Bell (2008) explain that teachers should begin their inquiry instruction at the lower levels and work their way to open inquiry in order to effectively develop students' inquiry skills. Open inquiry activities are only successful if students are motivated by intrinsic interests and if they are equipped with the skills to conduct their own research study.

=== Open/true inquiry learning ===
An important aspect of inquiry-based learning is the use of open learning, as evidence suggests that only utilizing lower level inquiry is not enough to develop critical and scientific thinking to the full potential. Open learning has no prescribed target or result that people have to achieve. There is an emphasis on the individual manipulating information and creating meaning from a set of given materials or circumstances. In many conventional and structured learning environments, people are told what the outcome is expected to be, and then they are simply expected to 'confirm' or show evidence that this is the case.

Open learning has many benefits. It means students do not simply perform experiments in a routine like fashion, but actually think about the results they collect and what they mean. With traditional non-open lessons there is a tendency for students to say that the experiment 'went wrong' when they collect results contrary to what they are told to expect. In open learning there are no wrong results, and students have to evaluate the strengths and weaknesses of the results they collect themselves and decide their value.

Open learning has been developed by a number of science educators including the American John Dewey and the German Martin Wagenschein. (Note: Wagenschein characterized his approach as Socratic, genetic, and example-based.) Wagenschein's ideas particularly complement both open learning and inquiry-based learning in teaching work. He emphasized that students should not be taught bald facts, but should understand and explain what they are learning. His most famous example of this was when he asked physics students to tell him what the speed of a falling object was. Nearly all students would produce an equation, but no students could explain what this equation meant. Wagenschein used this example to show the importance of understanding over knowledge.

Although both guided and open/true inquiry were found to promote science literacy and interest, each has its own advantages. While open/true inquiry may contribute to students' initiative, flexibility and adaptability better than guided inquiry in the long run, some claim that it may lead to high cognitive load and that guided inquiry is more efficient in terms of time and content learning.

=== Inquisitive learning ===
Sociologist of education Phillip Brown defined inquisitive learning as learning that is intrinsically motivated (e.g. by curiosity and interest in knowledge for its own sake), as opposed to acquisitive learning that is extrinsically motivated (e.g. by acquiring high scores on examinations to earn credentials). However, occasionally the term inquisitive learning is simply used as a synonym for inquiry-based learning.

=== Neuroscience ===
The literature states that inquiry requires multiple cognitive processes and variables, such as causality and co-occurrence that enrich with age and experience. Kuhn, et al. (2000) used explicit training workshops to teach children in grades six to eight in the United States how to inquire through a quantitative study. By completing an inquiry-based task at the end of the study, the participants demonstrated enhanced mental models by applying different inquiry strategies. In a similar study, Kuhan and Pease (2008) completed a longitudinal quantitative study following a set of American children from grades four to six to investigate the effectiveness of scaffolding strategies for inquiry. Results demonstrated that children benefitted from the scaffolding because they outperformed the grade seven control group on an inquiry task.

=== Teacher training ===
A new inquiry program tends to benefit from professional collaboration. The teacher training and process of using inquiry learning should be a joint mission to ensure the maximal amount of resources are used and that the teachers are producing the best learning scenarios. Twigg's (2010) education professionals who participated in her experiment emphasized year round professional development sessions, such as workshops, weekly meetings and observations, to ensure inquiry is being implemented in the class correctly. Another example is Chu's (2009) study, where the participants appreciated the professional collaboration of educators, information technicians and librarians to provide more resources and expertise for preparing the structure and resources for the inquiry project.

== By subject ==
=== Science education ===
==== History ====
A catalyst for reform within North American science education was the 1957 launch of Sputnik, the Soviet Union satellite. This historical scientific breakthrough caused a great deal of concern around the science and technology education the American students were receiving. In 1958 the U.S. congress developed and passed the National Defense Education Act in order to provide math and science teachers with adequate teaching materials.

==== Science standards ====
America's Next Generation Science Standards (NGSS) embrace student centered inquiry-based pedagogy by implementing a three-part approach to science education: Disciplinary Core Ideas (DCIs), Science and Engineering Practices (SEPs), and Cross Cutting Concepts (CCCs). The standards are designed so that students learn science by performing scientific practices in the classroom. Students use practices such as asking questions, planning and carrying out investigations, collaborating, collecting and analyzing data, and arguing from evidence to learn the core ideas and concepts in scientific content areas. These practices are comparable to the 21st century skills that have been shown to be indicators of success in modern societies and workplaces regardless of whether that field is science based.

==== Pedagogical applications ====
Inquiry-based pedagogy in science education has been shown to increase students' scientific knowledge and literacy when compared to when students are taught using more traditional pedagogical methods. However, even though students in inquiry-based classrooms are shown to have higher scientific knowledge, they have also been shown to have increased frustration and decreased confidence in scientific ability when compared to their peers taught using traditional methods. Research has also shown that while inquiry-based pedagogy has been shown to improve students' science achievement, social contexts must be taken into account. This is because achievement gaps among students may be as likely to widen as they are to decrease due to differences in student readiness for inquiry-based learning based on social and economic status differences.

In cases where students' scientific knowledge in an inquiry based classroom was not significantly different than their peers taught in traditional methods, student problem solving ability was found to be improved for inquiry learning students. Inquiry as a pedagogical framework and learning process fits within many educational models including problem-based learning and the 5E model of education.

===== Problem-based learning =====
Inquiry as a pedagogical framework has been shown to be especially effective when used along problem-based learning assignments. As a student-centered strategy, problem-based learning fits well within an inquiry based classroom. Students learn science by performing science: asking questions, designing experiments, collecting data, making claims, and using data to support claims. By creating a culture and community of inquiry in a science classroom, students learn science by working collaboratively with their peers to investigate the world around them and ways to solve problems affecting their communities. Students confronted with real world problems that affect their everyday lives are shown to have increased engagement and feel more encouraged to solve the problems posed to them.

===== 5E model of science education =====
The 5E model of science education is a planning structure that helps science teachers develop student centered inquiry-based lessons and units. In the 5E model, students learn science by exploring their questions using the same approach scientists explore their questions. By using this approach, science teachers help their students connect scientific content learned in the classroom with phenomena from their own lives and apply that learning to new areas, in science and beyond.

The 5E model is broken into the following sections which may repeat and occur at various stages of the learning process.

- Engage: This is generally considered to be the opening stage of the 5E model and is used to inspire student curiosity and should help students connect new phenomena to prior learning. This stage of the 5E model also aims to identify student misconceptions that need to be addressed through the lessons designed by the teacher.
- Explore: In this stage, students investigate the phenomena observed during the engage stage and answer any questions they have generated based on their observations. The level of inquiry (i.e. fully open vs. guided) may vary based on the level, age, and readiness of students
- Explain: In this stage, the teacher helps students piece together the information they gathered during the explore stage. Again, the level of direct teacher instruction and explanation may vary based on the level, age, and readiness of students.
- Elaborate/Expand: This stage determines if students are truly able to apply the information they have learned to new areas and to the solution of real world problems.
- Evaluate: In this stage students evaluate their own learning and the teacher evaluates student understanding and ability to apply knowledge to multiple areas.

==== Collaboration and communication ====
Effective collaboration and communication is an integral part of scientists' and engineers' everyday lives and their importance is reflected in the representation of these skills in the science and engineering practices of the Next Generation Science Standards. Inquiry education supports these skills, especially when students take part in a community of inquiry. Students who are actively collaborating and communicating in an inquiry based science class exhibit and develop many of these skills. Specifically, these students:

- make observations and ask questions with their peers
- work with peers to design solutions to problems
- analyze claims of their peers
- argue from evidence
- support their peers' growth and search for knowledge

=== Social studies and history ===
The College, Career, and Civic Life (C3) Framework for Social Studies State Standards was a joint collaboration among states and social studies organizations, including the National Council for the Social Studies, designed to focus social studies education on the practice of inquiry, emphasizing "the disciplinary concepts and practices that support students as they develop the capacity to know, analyze, explain, and argue about interdisciplinary challenges in our social world." The C3 Framework recommends an "Inquiry Arc" incorporating four dimensions: 1. developing questions and planning inquiries; 2. applying disciplinary concepts and tools; 3. evaluating primary sources and using evidence; and 4. communicating conclusions and taking informed action. For example, a theme for this approach could be an exploration of etiquette today and in the past. Students might formulate their own questions or begin with an essential question such as "Why are men and women expected to follow different codes of etiquette?" Students explore change and continuity of manners over time and the perspectives of different cultures and groups of people. They analyze primary source documents such as books of etiquette from different time periods and form conclusions that answer the inquiry questions. Students finally communicate their conclusions in formal essays or creative projects. They may also take action by recommending solutions for improving school climate.

Robert Bain in How Students Learn described a similar approach called "problematizing history". First a learning curriculum is organized around central concepts. Next, a question and primary sources are provided, such as eyewitness historical accounts. The task for inquiry is to create an interpretation of history that will answer the central question. Students will form a hypothesis, collect and consider information and revisit their hypothesis as they evaluate their data.

== By region ==
=== Ontario ===
After Charles Pascal's report in 2009, the Canadian province of Ontario's Ministry of Education decided to implement a full day kindergarten program that focuses on inquiry and play-based learning, called The Early Learning Kindergarten Program. As of September 2014, all primary schools in Ontario started the program. The curriculum document outlines the philosophy, definitions, process and core learning concepts for the program. Bronfenbrenner's ecological model, Vygotsky's zone of proximal development, Piaget's child development theory and Dewey's experiential learning are the heart of the program's design. As research shows, children learn best through play, whether it is independently or in a group. Three forms of play are noted in the curriculum document, pretend or "pretense" play, socio-dramatic play and constructive play. Through play and authentic experiences, children interact with their environment (people and/or objects) and question things; thus leading to inquiry learning. A chart on page 15 clearly outlines the process of inquiry for young children, including initial engagement, exploration, investigation, and communication. The new program supports holistic approach to learning. For further details, please see the curriculum document.

Since the program is extremely new, there is limited research on its success and areas of improvement. One government research report was released with the initial groups of children in the new kindergarten program. The Final Report: Evaluation of the Implementation of the Ontario Full-Day Early-Learning Kindergarten Program from Vanderlee, Youmans, Peters, and Eastabrook (2012) conclude with primary research that high-need children improved more compared to children who did not attend Ontario's new kindergarten program. As with inquiry-based learning in all divisions and subject areas, longitudinal research is needed to examine the full extent of this teaching/learning method.

=== Netherlands ===
Since 2013, Dutch children have participated in a curriculum of learning to read through an inquiry-based pedagogical program. The program, from the Dutch developmental psychologist Ewald Vervaet, is named Ontdekkend Leren Lezen (OLL; 'Discovery Learning to Read') and has three parts. OLL's main characteristic is that it is for children who are reading mature. Reading maturity is assessed with the Reading Maturity Test. It is a descriptive test that consists of two subtests.

== Benefits ==
Chu (2009) used a mixed method design to examine the outcome of an inquiry project completed by students in Hong Kong with the assistance of multiple educators. Chu's (2009) results show that the children were more motivated and academically successful compared to the control group.

Hmelo-Silver, Duncan, & Chinn cite several studies supporting the success of the constructivist problem-based and inquiry learning methods. For example, they describe a project called GenScope, an inquiry-based science software application. Students using the GenScope software showed significant gains over the control groups, with the largest gains shown in students from basic courses.

A large study by Geier on the effectiveness of inquiry-based science for middle school students, as demonstrated by their performance on high-stakes standardized tests, showed the improvement was 14% for the first cohort of students and 13% for the second cohort. This study also found that inquiry-based teaching methods greatly reduced the achievement gap for African-American students.

== Misconceptions ==
There are several common misconceptions regarding inquiry-based science, the first being that inquiry science is simply instruction that teaches students to follow the scientific method. Many teachers had the opportunity to work within the constraints of the scientific method as students themselves and assume inquiry learning must be the same. Inquiry science is not just about solving problems in six simple steps but much more broadly focused on the intellectual problem-solving skills developed throughout a scientific process. Additionally, not every hands-on lesson can be considered inquiry.

Some educators believe that there is only one true method of inquiry, which would be described as the level four: Open Inquiry. While open inquiry may be the most authentic form of inquiry, there are many skills and a level of conceptual understanding that the students must have developed before they can be successful at this high level of inquiry. While inquiry-based science is considered to be a teaching strategy that fosters higher order thinking in students, it should be one of several methods used. A multifaceted approach to science keeps students engaged and learning.

== Criticism ==
=== Empirical evidence ===
Kirschner, Sweller, and Clark (2006) review of literature found that although constructivists often cite each other's work, empirical evidence is not often cited. Nonetheless the constructivist movement gained great momentum in the 1990s, because many educators began to write about this philosophy of learning.

Inquiry-based teaching can be perceived as in conflict with standardized testing common in standards-based assessment systems which emphasize the measurement of student knowledge and skills.

Richard E. Mayer from the University of California, Santa Barbara, wrote in 2004 that there was sufficient research evidence to make any reasonable person skeptical about the benefits of discovery learning—practiced under the guise of cognitive constructivism or social constructivism—as a preferred instructional method. He reviewed research on discovery of problem-solving rules culminating in the 1960s, discovery of conservation strategies culminating in the 1970s, and discovery of LOGO programming strategies culminating in the 1980s. In each case, guided discovery was more effective than pure discovery in helping students learn and transfer.

The education podcast Sold a Story argued that education theorists dismissed evidence that direct instruction led to significantly better results in studies, notably because direct instruction is perceived as overly robotic.

=== Excess ===
In a 2006 article, the Thomas B. Fordham Institute's president, Chester E. Finn Jr., was quoted as saying "But like so many things in education, it gets carried to excess... [the approach is] fine to some degree." The organization ran a study in 2005 concluding that the emphasis states put on inquiry-based learning is too great.

=== Teacher and student effort ===
Inquiry-based learning takes a lot of planning before implementation. It is not something that can be put into place in the classroom quickly. Measurements must be put in place for how students knowledge and performance will be measured and how standards will be incorporated. The teacher's responsibility during inquiry exercises is to support and facilitate student learning (Bell et al., 769–770). A common mistake teachers make is lacking the vision to see where students' weaknesses lie. According to Bain, teachers cannot assume that students will hold the same assumptions and thinking processes as a professional within that discipline (p. 201).

Not every student is going to learn the same amount from an inquiry lesson; students must be invested in the topic of study to authentically reach the set learning goals. Teachers must be prepared to ask students questions to probe their thinking processes in order to assess accurately. Inquiry-science requires a lot of time, effort, and expertise, however, the benefits outweigh the cost when true authentic learning can take place.

== See also ==
- Action learning
- Critical thinking
- Design-based learning
- Discovery learning
- Networked learning
- Phenomenon-based learning
- POGIL
- Problem-based learning
- Progressive inquiry
- Project-based learning
- Scientific literacy
- Three-part lesson
