= Morris Kline =

American mathematician and historian of mathematics (1908–1992)

- Born: May 1, 1908; Brooklyn, New York, U.S.
- Died: June 10, 1992 (aged 84); Brooklyn
- Occupation: Mathematician
- Known for: Books on the teaching, practice, and history of mathematics

Academic background
- Education: Boys High School (Brooklyn); New York University (B.A. 1930; PhD 1936)
- Influences: Leonhard Euler; Richard Courant; Hermann Weyl

Academic work
- Discipline: Mathematics; History of mathematics
- Institutions: New York University (1938–1942; 1946–1975)

Morris Kline (May 1, 1908 – June 10, 1992) was a professor of mathematics who wrote extensively on the history, philosophy, and teaching of that subject. He was also a popularizer of mathematics.

== Early life and education ==
Kline was born to a Jewish family in Brooklyn on May 1, 1908, and resided in Jamaica, Queens. After graduating from Boys High School in Brooklyn, he studied mathematics at New York University, earning a bachelor's degree in 1930, a master's degree in 1932, and a doctorate (Ph.D.) in 1936. He then spent two years, 1936 to 1938, at the Institute for Advanced Study in Princeton, New Jersey, where, he recalled, he learned considerable mathematics.

== Career ==
After his time at the Institute for Advanced Study, Kline next worked at NYU as an instructor until 1942. Although he was originally trained in topology and worked as an assistant to James Alexander, Kline turned his attention to differential equations and applied mathematics after being convinced by Richard Courant that the greatest contribution a mathematician could make to society was to bring about the understanding of the world. He was influenced by the articles of Hermann Weyl for The American Mathematical Monthly and the works of Leonhard Euler.

During World War II, Kline was posted to the Signal Corps of the United States Army, and stationed at Belmar, New Jersey. Designated as a physicist, he worked in the engineering lab where radar was being developed. After the war, he continued investigating electromagnetism, and from 1946 to 1966, he was director of the Division of Electromagnetic Research at the Courant Institute of Mathematical Sciences.

After the war, Kline resumed his mathematical teaching at New York University, becoming a full professor in 1952. He taught at NYU until 1975. and wrote many papers and more than a dozen books on various aspects of mathematics and particularly the teaching of mathematics. He also published a textbook on calculus in 1967.

=== Writings on the teaching of mathematics ===
Kline repeatedly stressed the need to teach the applications and usefulness of mathematics rather than expecting students to enjoy it for its own sake. He cautioned, however, that these applications must be carefully selected to suit the level of the course being taught and that at the introductory level, intuition, not rigor, should be the main focus.

He issued multiple objections of how mathematics was taught in 1956, 1966, and 1970, as well as many of the textbooks written during this era. For Kline, an appreciation for rigor took time to be developed and it was ill-advised to teach the abstract before the concrete. He was a vocal critic of the New Math movement to reform the teaching of mathematics. In 1973, he published the book Why Johnny Can't Add: the Failure of the New Math. Its opening chapter is a parody of instruction as students' intuitions are challenged by the new jargon promoted by the New Math. He indicated that it was "practically impossible" to learn new mathematical creations without first understanding the old ones, and that "abstraction is not the first stage, but the last stage, in a mathematical development." Kline criticized the authors of the New Math textbooks, not for their mathematical faculty, but rather their narrow approach to mathematics, and their limited understanding of pedagogy and educational psychology. Many other scholars were also critical of these reforms. Harry Schwartz wrote in his review of the book for The New York Times: "Its significance goes far beyond its immediate topic. It raises the broader issue of how, in field after field in American life, there come to be sudden fixations on supposed panaceas for perceived problems. All too often, however, these panaceas turn out to have unforeseen consequences as bad as or worse than the original difficulties that triggered their adoption."

In 1977, Kline turned to undergraduate university education with the title Why the Professor Can't Teach: The Dilemma of University Education. Kline argues that the onus on professors in the United States to conduct research misdirects the scholarly method that characterizes good teaching. He lauded scholarship as expressed by expository writing or reviews of original work of others. For scholarship, he expects critical attitudes to topics, materials and methods. Kline reiterated E. H. Moore's recommendation to combine science and mathematics at the high school level. This book was negatively received by D.T. Finkbeiner, Harry Pollard, and Peter Hilton. Kline countered by complaining that many of these reviewers did not read the book but only a few excerpts from The Mathematical Intelligencer and noted that he had received many complimentary letters from instructors who shared his opinions and who resented the relentless pressure to undertake research, which came at the cost of good teaching.

=== Writing on the history of mathematics ===
In 1972, Kline published his voluminous title Mathematical Thought from Ancient to Modern Times. This book covers developments that have influenced mainstream mathematics from the times of ancient Babylon, Egypt, and Greece up until the early twentieth century. Kline made frequent use of primary sources, especially in the later chapters.

Gian-Carlo Rota praised Kline for reaching a compromise between depth and accessibility to the level of second-year undergraduate mathematics. Rota especially liked his treatment of classical topics such as Euclidean geometry, but cautioned that his handling of more modern topics such as functional analysis was dated. Rota disagreed Kline's critical view of contemporary mathematical research, which, in Kline's opinion, overemphasized abstraction at the expense of utility.

Ivor Grattan-Guinness indicated that while the book had a number of missed opportunities and technical errors or misinterpretations, this was nevertheless a strong presentation which dedicated much space—about half the book—to developments after 1800, which was unusual at the time of publication. He opined that Kline was at his best when discussing Euclidean geometry, calculus, and the sociology of mathematics over the last three centuries, but faltered in complex variables, linear algebra, and numerical analysis. He omitted probability theory and statistics.

Carl Benjamin Boyer also praised Kline for a detailed discussion of more recent developments in mathematics. Boyer especially praised Kline's handling of non-Euclidean geometry and his choice to cover topics not commonly found in other books on the history of mathematics, such as the Mathieu functions and the Navier–Stokes equations.

Lester Paldy deemed the book appropriate for teachers of physics as it contained a substantial amount of information on how mathematics had been applied to study physical phenomena.

=== Writings on mathematical research ===
Kline urged that mathematical research concentrate on solving problems posed in other fields, such as physics and computer science. In his own words, "the greatest contribution mathematicians had made and should continue to make was to help man understand the world about him." In Chapter XIII of Mathematics: The Loss of Certainty ("The Isolation of Mathematics"), he deplored the way mathematical research was being conducted, complaining that often mathematicians were not willing to become acquainted with the (sometimes deep) context needed to solve applied problems in sciences, and instead prefer to invent pure mathematics that were not necessarily of any consequence. He also blamed the publish or perish academic culture for this state of affairs. William Barrett of The New York Times praised it as an "immensely readable" account of the decline of mathematics due to conflicting schools of thought.

== Death ==
Kline died of heart failure at the Maimonides Hospital in Brooklyn, New York on June 10, 1992. He was 84 years old.

== Selected publications ==
Books

- Introduction to Mathematics (with Irvin W. Kay), Houghton Mifflin, 1937
- The Theory of Electromagnetic Waves (ed), Inter-science Publishers, 1951
- Mathematics in Western Culture, Oxford University Press,1953
- Mathematics and the Physical World, T. Y. Crowell Co., 1959
- Mathematics, A Cultural Approach, Addison-Wesley, 1962
- Mathematics for the Nonmathematician, Dover Publications, 1967
- Electromagnetic Theory and Geometrical Optics (with Irvin W. Kay), John Wiley and Sons, 1965
- Calculus, An intuitive and Physical Approach, John Wiley and Sons, 1967, 1977, Dover Publications 1998 reprint ISBN 0-486-40453-6
- Mathematics for Liberal Arts, Addison-Wesley, 1967, (republished as Mathematics for the Nonmathematician, Dover Publications, Inc., 1985) (ISBN 0-486-24823-2)
- Mathematics in the Modern World (ed), W. H. Freeman and Co., 1968
- Mathematical Thought From Ancient to Modern Times, Oxford University Press, 1972
- Why Johnny Can't Add: The Failure of the New Mathematics, St. Martin's Press, 1973 ISBN 978-0312877804
- Why the Professor Can't Teach: Mathematics and the Dilemma of University Education, St. Martin's Press, 1977 (ISBN 0-312-87867-2)
- Mathematics: The Loss of Certainty, Oxford University Press, 1980 (ISBN 0-19-502754-X); OUP Galaxy Books pb. reprint (ISBN 0-19-503085-0)
- Mathematics: An Introduction to Its Spirit and Use; readings from Scientific American
- Mathematics in the Modern World; readings from Scientific American
- The Language of Shapes (with Abraham Wolf Crown)
- Mathematics and the Search for Knowledge, Oxford University Press, 1985 (ISBN 0-19-503533-X)

== See also ==
- Mathematics and the Imagination (1940) by Edward Kasner and James R. Newman
- What Is Mathematics? (1941) by Richard Courant and Herbert Robbins
- Excellence Without a Soul (2006) by Harry R. Lewis
