= Mathematics and the Imagination =

Popular mathematics book from 1940

- First edition
- Author: Edward Kasner; James R. Newman
- Illustrator: Rufus Isaacs
- Language: English
- Subject: Mathematics
- Genre: Non-fiction
- Publisher: Simon & Schuster; Dover Publications (reprint)
- Publication date: 1940
- Publication place: United States
- Media type: Print
- Pages: 380 pp.
- ISBN: 978-0-486-41703-5 (reprint)

Mathematics and the Imagination is a book written by Edward Kasner and James R. Newman and illustrated by Rufus Isaacs, who provided 169 figures. It was published in New York by Simon & Schuster in 1940. It rapidly became a best-seller and received several glowing reviews. This book introduced the term googol for 10^{100}, and googolplex for 10^{googol}. It includes nine chapters, an annotated bibliography of 45 titles, and an index in its 380 pages.

== Reception ==
I. Bernard Cohen described it as "the best account of modern mathematics... written in a graceful style, combining clarity of exposition with good humor." Cohen believed it was suitable for both mathematicians and non-mathematicians alike. According to T. A. Ryan the book "is not as superficial as one might expect a book at the popular level to be. For instance, the description of the invention of the term googol ... is a very serious attempt to show how misused is the term infinite when applied to large and finite numbers." G. Waldo Dunnington could note the book had become a best-seller by 1941, writing, "Apparently it has succeeded in communicating to the layman something of the pleasure experienced by the creative mathematician in difficult problem solving."

== Contents ==
Chapter I ("New Names for Old") explains the significance of the concept of the function, the notions of rings and groups from abstract algebra, the Problem of Apollonius, radicals, and the Abel–Ruffini theorem, or impossibility of solving polynomial equations of the fifth or higher degree by radicals.

Chapter II ("Beyond Googol") treats the size or cardinality of a set, infinite sets, the differences between countable and uncountable sets, Cantor's theory of transfinite numbers, and the cardinality of the continuum, or the set of real numbers $\mathbb{R}$.

Chapter III ("$\pi$, $i$, $e$ (Pie)") goes over algebraic and transcendental numbers, the impossibility of doubling the cube or trisecting an angle by a straightedge and compass, the histories of Euler's number $e$ and $\pi$ (pi), the exponential function $y = e^x$, the imaginary unit $i$, the complex plane, the geometric interpretation of multiplication by $i$ as rotating by 90° counterclockwise, and Euler's identity $e^{i \pi} + 1 = 0$.

Chapter IV ("Assorted Geometries—Plane and Fancy") examines Euclid's fifth postulate, non-Euclidean geometry, and four-dimensional space.

Chapter V ("Pastimes of Past and Present Times") discusses various mathematical games or puzzles such as the Tower of Hanoi and the magic square; the decimal and binary systems; and Fermat's Last Theorem.

Chapter VI ("Paradox Lost and Paradox Regained") explores a number of paradoxes or fallacies in mathematics, such as the Banach–Tarski paradox in geometry and Russell's paradox in set theory.

Chapter VII ("Chance and Chanceablity") is about various topics in probability and statistics, such as Buffon's needle problem and the binomial theorem.

Chapter VIII ("Rubber-sheet Geometry") concerns concepts in topology, such as the Jordan curve theorem, the Euler characteristics, and the four-color map theorem.

Chapter IX ("Change and Changeability") elucidates the calculus, its history, and applications.

== See also ==
- What Is Mathematics? (1941) by Richard Courant and Herbert Robbins
- Mathematics and the Search for Knowledge (1985) by Morris Kline
