= Leinweber =

Leinweber is a surname. Notable people with the surname include:

- Anton Robert Leinweber (1845–1921), Bohemian German painter and illustrator
- Chris Leinweber (born 1981), Canadian ice hockey defenceman
- David Leinweber, head of the Lawrence Berkeley National Laboratory Computational Research Division's Center for Innovative Financial Technology
- Fred Leinweber (1915–?), American handballer
- Harry Leinweber (1907–1992), insurance underwriter and a municipal and provincial level politician
- Judi Leinweber (born 1950), Canadian alpine skier who competed in the 1968 Winter Olympics References
- Walter Leinweber (1907–1997), German ice hockey player who competed in the 1932 Winter Olympics
