= Farenthold =

Farenthold is a surname. Notable people with the surname include:

- Blake Farenthold (1961–2025), male Republican U.S. politician, U.S. House of Representatives
- David Fahrenthold (born 1978), journalist, The Washington Post
- Frances Farenthold (1926–2021), known as "Sissy", female Democratic U.S. politician, Texas House of Representatives
