= Frédérique Lenger =

Belgian mathematician (1921-2005)

Frédérique Papy-Lenger (August 12, 1921 – January 9, 2005) was a Belgian mathematician and mathematics educator active in the New Math movement of the 1960s and 1970s.

== Early life and education ==
Frédérique Lenger was born on August 12, 1921, in Arlon, Belgium, one of three daughters of a lawyer. After studying classics in the Lycée Royal d’Arlon, she studied for a licentiate in mathematics at the Université libre de Bruxelles from 1939 to 1943. The University officially closed in 1941 to prevent its takeover by the German occupation, and her studies continued underground.

In 1968, she completed a doctorate with a two-part thesis, one part on mathematics education and the other on geometric transformation groups.

== Career ==
From 1947 to 1950, Lenger taught mathematics at the l’Ecole Decroly, while working as an assistant to mathematician Paul Libois, who suggested that she perform research involving projective geometry and triality. This became a precursor to the work of another student of Libois, Jacques Tits. In 1950, Lenger joined the mathematics faculty of the Lycée Royal d’Arlon; in 1957, she was appointed prefect at Arlon and director of the State Normal School in Arlon.

She became a professor of mathematics at the Berkendael State Normal School in Brussels in 1960. In 1961, with several other mathematicians, she became one of the founders of the Centre Belge de Pédagogie de la Mathématique (Belgian Center for the Pedagogy of Mathematics). From 1974 to 1980 she worked in the US, at the Comprehensive School Mathematics Program in St. Louis, Missouri. She returned to Berkendael in 1980. She retired in 1981 but continued to work as a volunteer at the French school in Nivelles until 1992.

== Contributions ==
Lenger began her work on developing a modern school mathematics curriculum in 1958, working with Willy Servais and in consultation with Georges Papy, whom she married in 1960. With Madeleine Lepropre, Lenger ran an experimental training program for kindergarten teachers based on the new curriculum in 1958–1959, and was encouraged by the enthusiasm the kindergarten students showed for the material. With Papy, in the mid-1960s, she developed a six-volume high-school mathematics program based on the principles of set theory and abstract algebra.

In 1969, Lenger was an invited plenary speaker at the first International Congress on Mathematical Education in Lyon, France; speaking there on the "minicomputer" method for teaching binary number arithmetic to schoolchildren. She became the founding president of the International Research Group in Mathematical Pedagogy in 1971.

Her books include L'enfant et les graphes (Didier, 1968), Mathématique moderne (Didier, 1970), Modern mathematics (two vols., Collier, 1968 and 1969), Graph Games (Crowell, 1971), and Graphs and the Child (Harvard University Press, 1979). She also produced many educational booklets through the Belgian Center for the Pedagogy of Mathematics and the Comprehensive School Mathematics Program.

== Legacy ==
The rue Frédérique Lenger in Arlon is named after her.
