= James R. Newman =

American mathematician, science policy bureaucrat and historian

- Born: August 3, 1907; New York City, U.S.
- Died: May 28, 1966 (aged 58); Chevy Chase, Maryland, U.S.
- Education: CCNY; Columbia University; Columbia Law School
- Known for: Mathematics and the Imagination
- Scientific career
- Fields: Mathematics

James Roy Newman (August 3, 1907 – May 28, 1966) was an American mathematician and mathematical historian. He was also a lawyer, practicing in the state of New York from 1929 to 1941. During and after World War II, he held several positions in the United States government, including Chief Intelligence Officer at the US Embassy in London, Special Assistant to the Undersecretary of War, and Counsel to the US Senate Committee on Atomic Energy. In the latter capacity, he helped to draft the Atomic Energy Act of 1946. He became a member of the board of editors for Scientific American beginning in 1948. He is also credited for first publishing the mathematical term "googol" in his book Mathematics and The Imagination, co-authored with Edward Kasner.

== Author ==
In 1940 Newman and Edward Kasner wrote Mathematics and the Imagination, in which they reported the mathematical idea of a very large but finite number, called a "googol", consisting of 1 followed by 100 zeroes, and a larger number called a "googolplex". In 1942 Newman wrote The Tools of War, which was an illustrated examination of warfare. In 1948 he published The control of atomic energy with Byron S. Miller. In 1955 he wrote What is Science.

In 1956 Newman published The World of Mathematics, a four-volume library on the literature of mathematics from A'h-mosé the Scribe to Albert Einstein, presented with commentaries and notes (1956). The four volumes cover many branches of mathematics and represent a 15-year effort by Newman to collect what he felt were the most important essays in the field. With essays ranging from a biography of Srinivasa Ramanujan by Newman to Bertrand Russell's "Definition of Number", the series is often praised as suitable for any level of mathematical maturity. The series has been reprinted several times by various publishers.

Newman also wrote Gödel's Proof (1958) with Ernest Nagel, presenting the main results of Gödel's incompleteness theorem and the mathematical work and philosophies leading up to its discovery in a more accessible manner. This book inspired Douglas Hofstadter to take up the study of mathematical logic, write his famous book Gödel, Escher, Bach, and prepare a second edition of Gödel's Proof, published in 2002.

== Works ==
- 1940: (with Edward Kasner) Mathematics and the Imagination
- 1942 The Tools of War
- 1948: The Control of Atomic Energy via Internet Archive
- 1955: What is Science ?
- 1956: The World of Mathematics, 4 volumes, 2535 pages, Simon and Schuster LCCN 55-10060
- 1958: Nagel, Ernest; Newman, James R. (1958). Gödel's Proof. New York: New York University Press – via Internet Archive.
- 1961: Science and Sensibility
- 1962: The Rule of Folly
- 1963: The Harper Encyclopedia of Science
