= Traditional education =

Long-established customs traditionally used in schools

Traditional education, also known as back-to-basics, conventional education or customary education, is education following long-established customs that society has traditionally used in schools. Some forms of education reform promote the adoption of progressive education practices, and a more holistic approach which focuses on individual students' needs; academics, mental health, and social-emotional learning. In the eyes of reformers, traditional teacher-centered methods focused on rote learning and memorization must be abandoned in favor of student centered and task-based approaches to learning.

Depending on the context, the opposite of traditional education may be progressive education, modern education (the education approaches based on developmental psychology), or alternative education.

== Purposes ==
The primary purpose of traditional education is to continue passing on those skills, facts, and standards of moral and social conduct that adults consider to be necessary for the next generation's material advancement. As beneficiaries of this plan, which educational progressivist John Dewey described as being "imposed from above and from outside", the students are expected to docilely and obediently receive and believe these fixed answers. Teachers are the instruments by which this knowledge is communicated and these standards of behavior are enforced.

Historically, the primary educational technique of traditional education was simple oral recitation: In a typical approach, students spent some of their time sitting quietly at their places and listening to one student after another recite his or her lesson, until each had been called upon. The teacher's primary activity during such sessions was assigning and listening to these recitations; students studied and memorized the assignments at home. A test or oral examination might be given at the end of a unit, and the process, which was called "assignment–study–recitation–test", was repeated. There was also a reliance on rote memorization (memorization with no effort at understanding the meaning). It is believed that the use of recitation, rote memorization, and unrelated assignments is inefficient and an extremely inefficient use of students' and teachers' time. This traditional approach also insisted that all students be taught the same materials at the same point; students that did not learn quickly enough failed, rather than being allowed to succeed at their natural speeds. This approach, which had been imported from Europe, dominated American education until the end of the 19th century, when the education reform movement imported progressive education techniques from Europe.

Traditional education is associated with much stronger elements of coercion than seems acceptable now in most cultures. It has sometimes included: the use of corporal punishment to maintain classroom discipline or punish errors; inculcating the dominant religion and language; separating students according to gender, race, and social class, as well as teaching different subjects to girls and boys. In terms of curriculum there was and still is a high level of attention paid to time honored academic knowledge.

== Current status ==
In the present, it varies enormously from culture to culture, but still tends to be characterized by a much higher level of coercion than alternative education. Traditional schooling in Britain and its possessions and former colonies tends to follow the English Public School style of strictly enforced uniforms and a militaristic style of discipline. This can be contrasted with South African, US and Australian schools, which can have a much higher tolerance for spontaneous student-to-teacher communication.

== Instruction centre ==
Topic	Traditional approach	Alternative approaches
Person	Teacher-centred instruction: educational essentialism; educational perennialism	Student-centred instruction: educational progressivism
Main objective	High test scores, grades, graduation	Learning, retention, accumulation of valuable knowledge and skills
Classroom	Students matched by age, and possibly also by ability. All students in a classroom are taught the same material.	Students dynamically grouped by interest or ability for each project or subject, with the possibility of different groups each hour of the day. Multi-age classrooms or open classrooms.
Teaching methods	Traditional education emphasises: Direct instruction and lectures; Seatwork; Students learn through listening and observation	Progressive education emphasises: Hands-on activities; Student-led discovery; Group activities
Materials	Instruction based on textbooks, lectures, and individual written assignments	Project-based instruction using any available resource including Internet, library and outside experts
Subjects	Individual, independent subjects. Little connection between topics	Integrated, interdisciplinary subjects or theme-based units, such as reading a story about cooking a meal and calculating the cost of the food.
Content	Memorisation of facts, objective information; Correct knowledge is paramount	Understanding the facts, application of facts, analysis, evaluation, innovation; critical thinking is paramount
Social aspects	Little or no attention to social development. Focus on independent learning. Socialising largely discouraged except for extracurricular activities and teamwork-based projects.	Significant attention to social development, including teamwork, interpersonal relationships, and self-awareness.
Multiple tracks	A single, unified curriculum for all students, regardless of ability or interest.; Diverse class offerings without tracking, so that students receive a custom-tailored education.; Regarding the school-to-work transition, academically weak students must take some advanced classes, while the college-bound may have to spend half-days job shadowing at local businesses.	Students choose (or are encouraged to choose) different kinds of classes according to their perceived abilities or career plans. Decisions made early in education may preclude changes later, as a student on a vo-tech track may not have completed necessary prerequisite classes to switch to a university-preparation program.
Equity	Presentation and testing methods favour students who have prior exposure to the material or exposure in multiple contexts.; Requirements to study or memorise outside school inadvertently tests homes, not students.; Students from homes where tested subjects are used in common conversation, or homes where students are routinely given individual help to gain context beyond memorisation, score on tests at significantly higher levels.	Context learning integrates personal knowledge within the school environment.; Individualised expectations simplifies individual supports and keeps focus student-based.; Community study settings include multiple cultures and expose all students to diversity.
Student and teacher relationship	Students often address teachers formally by their last names. The teacher is considered a respected role model in the community. Students should obey the teacher. Proper behaviour for the university or professional work community is emphasised.	In alternative schools, students may be allowed to call teachers by their first names. Students and teachers may work together as collaborators.

== Marking ==
Topic	Traditional approach	Alternative approaches
Communicating with parents	A few numbers, letters, or words are used to summarise overall achievement in each class. Marks may be assigned according to objective individual performance (usually the number of correct answers) or compared to other students (best students get the best grades, worst students get poor grades). A passing grade may or may not signify mastery: a failing student may know the material but not complete homework assignments, and a passing student may turn in all homework but still not understand the material.	Many possible forms of communicating achievements: Teachers may be required to write personalized narrative evaluations about student achievement and abilities.; Under standards-based education, a government agency may require all students to pass a test; students who fail to perform adequately on the test may not be promoted.
Expectations	Students will graduate with different grades. Some students will fail due to poor performance based on a lack of understanding or incomplete assignments.	All students need to achieve a basic level of education, even if this means spending extra years in school.
Grade inflation/deflation	Achievement based on performance compared to a reasonably stable, probably informal standard which is highly similar to what previous students experienced.	The value of any given mark is often hard to standardise in alternative grading schemes. Comparison of students in different classes may be difficult or impossible.

== Subject areas ==
Topic	Traditional approach	Alternative approaches
Mathematics	Traditional mathematics: Emphasis is on memorisation of basic facts such as the multiplication table and mastering step-by-step arithmetic algorithms by studying examples and much practice.; One correct answer is sought, using one "standard" method.; Mathematics after elementary grades is tracked with different students covering different levels of material.; Mathematics is taught as its own discipline without emphasis on social, political or global issues. There may be some emphasis on practical applications in science and technology.	Curriculum de-emphasises procedural knowledge drills in favour of technology (calculators, computers) and an emphasis on conceptual understanding.; Lessons may include more exploratory material supportive of conceptual understanding, rather than direct presentation of facts and methods.; Emphasis may be on practical applications and greater issues such as the environment, gender and racial diversity, and social justice.; Mathematics lessons may include writing, drawing, games, and instruction with manipulatives rather than filling out worksheets.; Lessons may include exploration of concepts allowing students to invent their own procedures before teaching standard algorithms.; Grading may be based on demonstration of conceptual understanding rather than entirely on whether the final answer is correct.; In some countries (e.g. the United States), there may be expectations of high achievement and mastering algebra for all students rather than tracking some students into business math and others into mathematics for math and science careers.
Science	Fact-based science: Science class is an opportunity to transmit concrete knowledge and specific vocabulary from the teacher (or textbook) to the students. Students focus on memorising what they are told. "Experiments" follow cookbook-style procedures to produce the expected results.	With inquiry-based science a student might be asked to devise an experiment to demonstrate that Earth orbits the Sun. The emphasis changes from memorising information that was learned through a scientific method to actually using the scientific method of discovery.
Reading	Phonics: The focus is on explicit training in sound to letter correspondence rules and the mechanics of decoding individual words. Students initially focus on phonics subskills and reading simplified decodable texts. When they have mastered a sufficient number of rules, they are allowed to read freely and extensively. (In many languages, such as French, Spanish and Greek, phonics is taught in the context of reading simple open syllables.)	With whole language, in which children learn words as wholes, the child is exposed to rich, relevant language that can heighten motivation to read. Learning to read is assumed to be as natural. While advocates of traditional education overwhelmingly favor phonics, and the whole language approach is associated with progressive education, many advocates of progressive education favor phonics and phonemic awareness as the empirically superior method.

== See also ==
- Classical education movement, which emphasizes Western Civilization
- List of abandoned education methods
- Curriculum
