= Secondary School Mathematics Curriculum Improvement Study =

The Secondary School Mathematics Curriculum Improvement Study (SSMCIS) was the name of an American mathematics education program that stood for both the name of a curriculum and the name of the project that was responsible for developing curriculum materials. It is considered part of the second round of initiatives in the "New Math" movement of the 1960s. The program was led by Howard F. Fehr, a professor at Columbia University Teachers College.

The program's signature goal was to create a unified treatment of mathematics and eliminate the traditional separate per-year studies of algebra, geometry, trigonometry, and so forth, that was typical of American secondary schools. Instead, the treatment unified those branches by studying fundamental concepts such as sets, relations, operations, and mappings, and fundamental structures such as groups, rings, fields, and vector spaces. The SSMCIS program produced six courses' worth of class material, intended for grades 7 through 12, in textbooks called Unified Modern Mathematics. Some 25,000 students took SSMCIS courses nationwide during the late 1960s and early 1970s.

== Background ==
The program was led by Howard F. Fehr, a professor at Columbia University Teachers College who was internationally known and had published numerous mathematics textbooks and hundreds of articles about mathematics teaching. In 1961 he had been the principal author of the 246-page report "New Thinking in School Mathematics", which held that traditional teaching of mathematics approaches did not meet the needs of the new technical society being entered into or of the current language of mathematicians and scientists. Fehr considered the separation of mathematical study into separate years of distinct subjects to be an American failing that followed an educational model two hundred years old.

The new curriculum was inspired by the seminar reports from the Organisation for Economic Co-operation and Development in the early 1960s and by the Cambridge Conference on School Mathematics (1963), which also inspired the Comprehensive School Mathematics Program. There were some interactions among these initiatives in the early stages, and the development of SSMCIS was part of a general wave of cooperation in the mathematics education reform movement between Europe and the U.S.

== Curriculum ==
"The construction is to be free of any restrictions of traditional content or sequence."

—From the initial announcement of the curriculum work of the SSMCIS

Work on the SSMCIS program began in 1965 and took place mainly at Teachers College. Fehr was the director of the project from 1965 to 1973. The principal consultants in the initial stages and subsequent yearly planning sessions were Marshall H. Stone of the University of Chicago, Albert W. Tucker of Princeton University, Edgar Lorch of Columbia University, and Meyer Jordan of Brooklyn College. The program was targeted at the junior high and high school level and the 15–20 percent best students in a grade.

Funding for the initiative began with the U.S. Office of Education and covered the development of the first three courses produced; the last three courses produced, as well as teacher training, were funded by the National Science Foundation and by Teachers College itself. The scope and sequence of the curriculum was developed by eighteen mathematicians from the U.S. and Europe in 1966 and subsequently refined in experimental course material by mathematical educators with high school level teaching experience. By 1971, some thirty-eight contributors to course materials were identified, eight from Teachers College, four from Europe, one from Canada, and the rest from various other universities (and a couple of high schools) in the United States. Fehr did not do much curriculum development himself, but rather recruited and led the others and organized the whole process. Graduate students from the Department of Mathematical Education at Teachers College also served each year in various capacities on the SSMCIS program.

The central idea of the program was to organize mathematics not by algebra, geometry, etc., but rather to unify those branches by studying the fundamental concepts of sets, relations, operations, and mappings, and fundamental structures such as groups, rings, fields, and vector spaces. Other terms used for this approach included "global" or "integrated"; Fehr himself spoke of a "spiral" or "helical" development, and wrote of "the spirit of global organization that is at the heart of the SSMCIS curriculum – important mathematical systems unified by a core of fundamental concepts and structures common to all.

For example, as the courses progressed, the concept of mappings was used to describe, and visually illustrate, the traditionally disparate topics of translation, line reflection, probability of an event, trigonometric functions, isomorphism and complex numbers, and analysis and linear mappings. Traditional subjects were broken up, such that the course material for each year included some material related to algebra, some to geometry, and so forth.

Even when abstract concepts were being introduced, they were introduced in concrete, intuitive forms, especially at the younger levels. Logical proofs were introduced early on and built in importance as the years developed. At least one year of university-level mathematics education was incorporated into the later courses. Solving traditional applications problems was de-emphasized, especially in the earlier courses, but the intent of the project was to make up for that with its focus on real numbers in measurements, computer programming, and probability and statistics. In particular, the last of these was a pronounced element of the SSMCIS, with substantial material on it present in all six courses, from measures of statistical dispersion to combinatorics to Bayes' theorem and more.

The curriculum that SSMCIS devised had influences from earlier reform work in Europe, going back to the Bourbaki group's work in France in the 1930s and the Synopses for Modern Secondary School Mathematics published in Paris in 1961. Indeed, most European secondary schools were teaching a more integrated approach. Also, this was one of several American efforts to address a particularly controversial issue, the teaching of a full year of Euclidean geometry in secondary school. Like many of the others, it did this by teaching geometric transformations as a unifying approach between algebra and geometry.

Regardless of all these influences and other projects, the SSMCIS study group considered its work unique in scope and breadth, and Fehr wrote that "nowhere [else] had a total 7–12 unified mathematics program been designed, produced, and tested." It was thus considered one of the more radical of the reform efforts lumped under the "New Math" label. Moreover, Fehr believed that the SSMCIS could not just improve students' thinking in mathematics, but in all subjects, by "develop[ing] the capacity of the human mind for the observation, selection, generalization, abstraction, and construction of models for use in the other disciplines."

== Materials ==
The paper covers of the course books had a different color for each of the six courses: light blue, yellow, light green (here), red, blue, dark red.

The course books put out by SSMCIS were titled Unified Modern Mathematics, and labeled as Course I through Course VI, with the two volumes in each year labeled as Part I and Part II. Materials for the next year's course were prepared each year, thus keeping up with the early adoption programs underway. Using largely formative evaluation methods for gaining teacher feedback, revised versions were put out after the first year's teaching experience. By 1973, the revised version of all six courses had been completed. The first three volumes were put into the public domain for any organization to use.

The pages of the books were formatted by typewriter, augmented by some mathematical symbols and inserted graphs, bound in paper, and published by Teachers College itself. A more polished hardcover version of Courses I through IV was put out in subsequent years by Addison-Wesley; these were adaptations made by Fehr and others and targeted to students with a broader range of mathematical ability.

Computer programming on time-shared computer systems was included in the curriculum both for its own importance and for understanding numerical methods. The first course introduced flow charts and the notion of algorithms. The beginning portion of the fourth-year course was devoted to introducing the BASIC programming language, with an emphasis on fundamental control flow statements, continued use of flow charts for design, and numerical programming applications. Interactive teletype interfaces on slow and erratic dial-up connections, with troublesome paper tape for offline storage, was the typical physical environment.

== Adoption ==
Starting in 1966, teachers from nine junior high and high schools, mostly in the New York metropolitan area, began getting training in the study program at Teachers College. Such training was crucial since few junior high or high school teachers knew all the material that would be introduced. They then returned to their schools and began teaching the experimental courses, two teachers per grade. For instance, Leonia High School, which incorporated grades 8–12 (since there was no middle school then), called the program "Math X" for experimental, with individual courses called Math 8X, Math 9X, etc. Hunter College High School used it as the basis for its Extended Honors Program; the school's description stated that the program "includes many advanced topics and requires extensive preparation and a considerable commitment of time to the study of mathematics." Students were periodically given standardized tests to make sure there was no decline in performance due to the unusual organization of material. Some 400 students were involved in this initial phase.

Because the program was so different from standard U.S. mathematics curricula, it was quite difficult to students to enter after the first year; students did, however, sometimes drop out of it and return to standard courses. As teaching the program was a specialized activity, teachers tended to move along from each grade to the next with their students, and so it was typical for students to have one of the same two teachers, or even the same teacher, for five or six years in a row.

More teachers were added in 1968 and 1969 and the University of Maryland and University of Arizona were added as teaching sites. Eighteen schools in Los Angeles adopted SSMCIS in what was called the Accelerated Mathematics Instruction program; some 2,500 gifted students took part. By 1971, teacher education programs were being conducted in places like Austin Peay State University in Tennessee, which was attended by junior high school teachers from seventeen states and one foreign country. By 1974, Fehr stated that 25,000 students were taking SSMCIS courses across the U.S.

== Results ==
Teacher's guides were also available for SSMCIS.

The Secondary School Mathematics Curriculum Improvement Study program did show some success in its educational purpose. A study of the Los Angeles program found that SSMCIS-taught students had a better attitude toward their program than did students using School Mathematics Study Group courses (another "New Math" initiative) or traditional courses. In New York State schools, special examinations were given to tenth and eleventh grade SSMCIS students in lieu of the standard Regents Examinations due to a mismatch in curriculum. However, SSMCIS was one of the direct inspirations for the New York State Education Department, in the late 1970s and 1980s, adopting an integrated, three-year mathematics curriculum for all its students, combining algebra, geometry, and trigonometry with an increased emphasis in probability and statistics.

Given the differences in subject matter and approach, how SSMCIS-taught students would perform on College Entrance Examination Board tests became a major concern of parents and students and teachers. A 1973 report compared the test performance of such students with those from traditional mathematics curricula. It found that the SSMCIS students did better on the mathematics portion of the Preliminary Scholastic Aptitude Test (PSAT), even when matched for background and performance on the verbal portion. It also found that SSMCIS students did just as well on the Mathematics Level II Achievement Test as traditional students taking college preparatory courses or, indeed, as college freshmen taking introductory calculus courses. Another study found SSMCIS students well prepared for the mathematics portion of the regular Scholastic Aptitude Test.

However, SSMCIS developed slowly. Funding became an issue, and indeed it was never funded as well as some other mathematics curriculum efforts had been. Despite the federal funding source, there was no centralized, national focal point in the U.S. for curriculum changes – such as some European countries had – and that made adoption of SSMCIS innovations a harder task. By the mid-1970s there was a growing backlash against the "New Math" movement, spurred in part by a perceived decline in standardized test scores and by Morris Kline's critical book Why Johnny Can't Add: The Failure of the New Math. Many reform efforts had underestimated the difficulty of getting the public and the mathematics educational community to believe that major changes were really necessary, especially for secondary school programs where college entrance performance was always the key concern of administrators. Federal funding for curriculum development also came under attack from American conservatives in the U.S. Congress. As one of the participants in creating SSMCIS, James T. Fey of Teachers College, later wrote, "Schools and societal expectations of schools appear to change very slowly." In the end, SSMCIS never became widely adopted.

== Legacy ==
One SSMCIS student, Toomas Hendrik Ilves of Leonia High School, decades later became Foreign Minister and then President of Estonia. He credited the SSMCIS course, the early exposure it gave him to computer programming, and the teacher of the course, Christine Cummings, with his subsequent interest in computer infrastructure, which in part resulted in the country leaping over its Soviet-era technological backwardness; computer-accessible education became pervasive in Estonian schools, and the Internet in Estonia has one of the highest penetration rates in the world. As his tenure as president came to a close in 2016, Ilves visited his old school building with Cummings and said, "I owe everything to her. Because of what she taught us, my country now uses it." Cummings said that SSMCIS not only introduced beginning computer programming but also taught students "how to think".

SSMCIS did represent a productive exercise in thinking about mathematics curriculum, and the mathematics education literature would cite it in subsequent years, including references to it as a distinct, and the most radical, approach to teaching geometry; as using functions as a unifying element of teaching mathematics; and as its course materials having value when used as the vehicle for further research in mathematics education.
