= Excellence Without a Soul =

Book by Harry R. Lewis

Excellence Without A Soul: How a Great University Forgot Education
- Author: Harry R. Lewis
- Language: English
- Subject: Harvard University
- Genre: Non-fiction
- Publisher: PublicAffairs
- Publication date: 2006
- Publication place: United States
- Media type: Print (hardcover and paperback), and electronic
- Pages: 320
- ISBN: 978-1-586-48393-7 (hardcover)

Excellence Without A Soul: How a Great University Forgot Education (reissued as Excellence Without a Soul: Does Liberal Education Have a Future?) is a 2006 book by Harry R. Lewis, professor of computer science and former dean of Harvard College, examining the state of his home institution, though much of what he says applies to American higher education in general. It attracted considerable attention for its trenchant analysis of undergraduate education, much of it based on his experience as dean from 1995 to 2003.

Lewis identifies the major problems to be grade inflation, college athletics, the lack of a meaningful core curriculum, the commercialization of higher education, helicopter parenting, and sexual harassment.

Lewis points out that grade inflation is nothing new, and that the majority of Harvard students graduates with Honors, especially in the humanities. Professors face pressure from not just students but also administrators making decisions about tenure to be lenient on their students. While different professors can have drastically different grading criteria, little is done to align those standards. But a novel development is that some parents even call faculty members should they deem their children's grades to be too low. Lewis accuses these "helicopter parents" of preventing their children from becoming independent, responsible, and resilient adults. He has attempted to take a stand against this mindset, he feels undercut by the President Lawrence Summers who promises to give the school's "customers" precisely what they want. He accuses Harvard of drifting along in complacency even though it, and other elite institutions, are in a position to push back against this entitled approach to higher education.

On the other hand, some of this might be due to students' better performance and preparation. Lewis argues that GPA should not be used as a primary means of gauging academic performance, because it encourages students to select their courses in order to maximize grades instead of optimizing their education. Students would be motivated to do well provided their professors design courses to be interesting. However, grade inflation is, in his opinion, not as serious as some of the other problems facing the University.

Presidents, deans, and professors rarely tell students simple truths, for example that the strategizing and diligence that got them into the college of their choice may not, if followed thoughtlessly, lead to an adult life they will find worth living.

— p.xiii

According to Lewis, modern Harvard has relinquished its role in shaping the moral character of its students, implementing instead the "cafeteria model" of education. By allowing professors to teach what they please and students to learn what they wish, he argues, Harvard risks preventing students from being exposed to what they may disagree with, and to the differing viewpoints of their professors. For Lewis, this undermines the very nature of a liberal education, with its emphasis on the holistic development of young adults. Meanwhile, the pursuit of academic excellence often forces students into isolation and stiff competition with their peers. He complains that Harvard University has grown indifferent to the civic values of liberties of American society, despite being reliant on them. He writes, "The Enlightenment ideal of human liberty and the philosophy embodied in American democracy barely exist in the current Harvard curriculum." Reviewer Jim Sleeper mentions that some of his students at Yale University share the same apathy or even contempt for the American tradition.

The old ideal of a liberal education lives on in name only. No longer does Harvard teach the things that will free the human mind and spirit.

— p. 253

Lewis criticizes former President of Harvard University, Lawrence Summers, for failing to deliver the promise of improving the experience of students by increasing their direct contact with members of the faculty. Lewis claims that Summers merely expanded the non-academic bureaucracy for handling the student body. As a result, relations between students and faculty have deteriorated considerably, so much so that student-faculty contact at Harvard is now below the national average. Professors are generally evaluated for their research, and not their teaching. For Lewis, it should not be a surprise that faculty members typically care little for their students but rather some actually do care, despite having no incentives for doing so. Moreover, students are not treated as people to be educated and challenged to grow but rather customers to be pleased. This way of thinking has led Harvard to abandon its educational mission to focus on the pursuit of consumerist values, reputation, and competition with other institutions, making Harvard and other schools prone to fads. For their part, students and their parents are disappointed at how callously they are treated by faculty, except when they might be potential research collaborators, but they also conceive of higher education as no more than a means to an end of securing lucrative careers and material comfort. Moral character, developing a meaningful philosophy of life, or social responsibility are not considered important. Lewis writes, "Something is wrong with our educational system when so many graduating Harvard seniors see consulting and investment banking as their best options for productive lives." Thus, whereas student dormitories were originally conceived of as a way for students and their tutors to live democratically with one another, today, these are established to serve students' comfort. However, although Lewis holds Lawrence responsible for Harvard putting an undue emphasis on public relations and for commercializing Harvard, he acknowledges that Lawrence has been shaped by larger forces influencing research universities, leading the Harvard Corporation to pick him in the first place. Reviewer Rebecca Owens of Messiah College acknowledges that faith-based institutions are also not immune to these trends.

Lewis complains that Harvard handles cases of alleged rape as if the women involved bear no responsibilities whatsoever, making it seem as if they are completely helpless.

Lewis defends college athletes for their drive, perseverance, and dedication, though he criticizes their focus on winning despite being amateurs, and their pursuit of money instead of intellectual growth.

Some reviewers have taken issue with Lewis's use of the word soul as quaint or tainted by religion. William Gasarch of the University of Maryland asks rhetorically whether Harvard had a "soul" when it was a school of divinity. On the other hand, Rebecca Owens asserts that Christian education might be the answer to the status quo. Pilar Mendoza of Oklahoma State University opines that Lewis puts an undue emphasis on liberal education over, for instance, vocational education. David Palfreyman of the University of Oxford describes Excellence Without a Soul as "a splendid recruitment tool" for smaller liberal arts colleges that can provide a better student experience, higher quality teaching, and good prospects for a lucrative career post-graduation despite costing just about the same. But Christopher Shea of The Washington Post claims that this book will not dissuade any ambitious high-school students from wanting to apply for admissions at Harvard or at least to tour the campus. Shea also notes the difficulty of balancing research and teaching, but indicates that the former should be prioritized.

It has been translated into Chinese and Korean.
