= Edna Kramer =

American mathematician (1902–1984)

Edna Ernestine Kramer Lassar
- Born: May 11, 1902; Manhattan, New York, US
- Died: July 9, 1984; Manhattan, New York, US

Edna Ernestine Kramer Lassar (May 11, 1902 – July 9, 1984), born Edna Ernestine Kramer, was an American mathematician and author of mathematics books.

Kramer was born in Manhattan to Jewish immigrants. She earned her B.A. summa cum laude in mathematics from Hunter College in 1922. While teaching at local high schools, she earned her M.A. in 1925 and Ph.D. in 1930 in mathematics (with a minor in physics) from Columbia University with Edward Kasner as her advisor.

She wrote The Nature and Growth of Modern Mathematics, A First Course in Educational Statistics, Mathematics Takes Wings: An Aviation Supplement to Secondary Mathematics, and The Main Stream of Mathematics.

Kramer married the French teacher Benedict Taxier Lassar on July 2, 1935. Kramer-Lassar died at the age of 82 in Manhattan of Parkinson's disease.

== Works ==
- The Main Stream of Mathematics [sic] (1951)
- The Nature and Growth of Modern Mathematics (1970)
