= Mathematics: The Loss of Certainty =

1980 book by Morris Kline

- Author: Morris Kline
- Publisher: Oxford University Press
- Publication date: 1980
- Pages: 366
- ISBN: 0-19-502754-X
- OCLC: 6042956
- Followed by: Mathematics and the Search for Knowledge

Mathematics: The Loss of Certainty is a book by Morris Kline on the developing perspectives within mathematical cultures throughout the centuries.

This book traces the history of how new results in mathematics have provided surprises to mathematicians through the ages. Examples include how 19th century mathematicians were surprised by the discovery of non-Euclidean geometry and how Godel's incompleteness theorem disappointed many logicians.

Kline furthermore discusses the close relation of some of the most prominent mathematicians such as Newton and Leibniz to God. He believes that Newton's religious interests were the true motivation of his mathematical and scientific work. He quotes Newton from a letter to Reverend Richard Bentley of December 10, 1692:

When I wrote my treatise about our system The Mathematical Principles of Natural Philosophy, I had an eye on such principles as might work with considering men for the belief in a Deity; and nothing can rejoice me more than to find it useful for that purpose.

He also believes Leibniz regarded science as a religious mission which scientists were duty bound to undertake. Kline quotes Leibniz from an undated letter of 1699 or 1700:

It seems to me that the principal goal of the whole of mankind must be the knowledge and development of the wonders of God, and that this is the reason that God gave him the empire of the globe.

Kline also argues that the attempt to establish a universally acceptable, logically sound body of mathematics has failed. He believes that most mathematicians today do not work on applications. Instead they continue to produce new results in pure mathematics at an ever-increasing pace.

== Criticism ==
In the reviews of this book, a number of specialists, paying tribute to the author's outlook, accuse him of biased emotionality, dishonesty and incompetence.

In particular, Raymond G. Ayoub in The American Mathematical Monthly writes:

For centuries, Euclidean geometry seemed to be a good model of space. The results were and still are used effectively in astronomy and in navigation. When it was subjected to the close scrutiny of formalism, it was found to have weaknesses and it is interesting to observe that, this time, it was the close scrutiny of the formalism that led to the discovery (some would say invention) of non-Euclidean geometry. (It was several years later that a satisfactory Euclidean model was devised.)

This writer fails to see why this discovery was, in the words of Kline, a "debacle". Is it not, on the contrary, a great triumph?...

Professor Kline does not deal honestly with his readers. He is a learned man and knows perfectly well that many mathematical ideas created in abstracto have found significant application in the real world. He chooses to ignore this fact, acknowledged by even the most fanatic opponents of mathematics. He does this to support an untenable dogma. One is reminded of the story of the court jester to Louis XIV: the latter had written a poem and asked the jester his opinion. "Your majesty is capable of anything. Your majesty has set out to write doggerel and your majesty has succeeded." On balance, such, alas, must be said of this book.

John Corcoran in Mathematical Reviews:

The overall purpose of the book is to advance as a philosophy of mathematics a mentalistic pragmatism which exalts "applied mathematics" and denigrates both "pure mathematics" and foundational studies. Although its thesis is predicated in part on the deep foundational achievements of twentieth century logicians, the basic philosophy is a close cousin of various philosophies which were influential in the nineteenth century. Moreover, as can be seen from the above-listed ideas, the author's grasp of twentieth century logic is not reliable. Accordingly he finds it surprising (p. 322, 323) that Hilbert, Gödel, Church, members of the Bourbaki school, and other "leaders in the work on foundations affirm that the mathematical concepts and properties exist in some objective sense and that they can be apprehended by human minds". His only argument against the Platonistic realism of the mathematicians just mentioned is based on his own failure to make the distinction between (human) error and (mathematical) falsehood (p. 324)...

The author does not seem to realize that in order to have knowledge it is not necessary to be infallible, nor does he recognize that loss of certainty is not the same as loss of truth. The philosophical and the foundational aspects of the author's argument are woven into a comprehensive survey and interpretation of the history of mathematics. One could hope that the argument would be somewhat redeemed by sound historical work, but this is not so. Two of the periods most important for the author's viewpoint are both interpreted inconsistently. (a) In some passages the author admits the obvious truth that experience and observation played a key role in the development of classical Greek mathematics (pp. 9, 18, 24, 167). But in other passages, he alleges that classical Greek mathematicians scorned experience and observation, founding their theories on "self-evident truths" (pp. 17, 20, 21, 22, 29, 95, 307). (b) In some passages the author portrays the beginning of the nineteenth century as a time of widespread confidence in the soundness of mathematics (pp. 6, 68, 78, 103, 173), but in other passages he describes this period as a time of intellectual turmoil wherein mathematicians entertained grave doubts about the basis of their science (pp. 152, 153, 170, 308)...

One can only regret the philosophical, foundational, and historical inadequacies which vitiate the main argument and which tend to distract attention from the many sound and fascinating observations and insights provided by the book.

Amy Dahan in Revue d'histoire des sciences:

Quant aux derniers chapitres sur les grandes tendances des mathématiques contemporaines, ils sont franchement décevants, assez superficiels. Il n'y a pas d'analyse de la mathématique contemporaine (grande période structuraliste, retour au « concret », flux entre les mathématiques et la physique, etc.

As for the last chapters on the major trends of contemporary mathematics, they are frankly disappointing, quite superficial. There is no analysis of contemporary mathematics (great structuralist period, return to the "concrete", flow between mathematics and physics, etc.

Scott Weinstein in ETC: A Review of General Semantics:

Professor Kline's book is a lively account of a fascinating subject. Its conclusions are, however, overdrawn and in many cases unjustified. The lesson to be learned from twentieth century foundational research is not that mathematics is in a sorry state, but rather the extent to which deep philosophical issues about mathematics may be illuminated, if not settled, by mathematics itself. Gödel's theorems do indeed intimate that there may be limits to what we can come to know in mathematics, but they also demonstrate through themselves the great heights to which human reason can ascend through mathematical thought.

Ian Stewart in Educational Studies in Mathematics:

This book is firmly in the tradition that we have come to expect from this author; and my reaction to it is much like my reaction to its predecessors: I think three quarters of it is superb, and the other quarter is outrageous nonsense; and the reason is that Morris Kline really doesn't understand what today's mathematics is about, although he has an enviable grasp of yesterday's...

Morris Kline has said elsewhere that he considers the crowning achievement of twentieth-century mathematics to be the Godel theorem. I don't agree: the Gödel theorem, astonishing and deep as it is, had little effect on the mainstream of real mathematical development. It didn't actually lead into anything new and powerful except more theorems of the same kind. It affected how mathematicians thought about what they were doing; but its effect on what they actually did is close to zero. Compare this to the rise of topology: fifty years of apparently introverted efforts by mathematicians, largely ignoring applied science; polished and perfected and developed into a body of technique of immense and still largely unrealised power; and within the last decade becoming important in virtually every field of applied science: engineering, physics, chemistry, numerical analysis. Topology has far more claim to be the crowning achievement of this century.

But Morris Kline can see only the introversion. It doesn't seem to occur to him that a mathematical problem may require concentrated contemplation of mathematics, rather than the problem to which one hopes to apply the resulting theory, to obtain a satisfactory solution. But if I want to cut down an apple tree, and my saw is too blunt, no amount of contemplation of the tree will sharpen it...

There is good mathematics; there is bad mathematics. There are mathematicians who are totally uninterested in science, who are building tools that science will find indispensable. There are mathematicians passionately interested in science, and building tools for specific use there, whose work will become as obsolete as the Zeppelin or the electronic valve. The path from discovery to utility is a rabbit-warren of false ends: mathematics for its own sake has had, and will continue to have, its place in the scheme of things. And, after all, the isolation of the topologist who knows no physics is no worse than that of the physicist who knows no topology. Today's science requires specialization from its individuals: the collective activity of scientists as a whole is where the links are forged. If only Morris Kline showed some inkling of the nature of this process, I would take his arguments more seriously. But his claim that mathematics has gone into decline is one based too much on ignorance, and his arguments are tawdry in comparison to the marvellous, shining vigour of today's mathematics. I too would like to see more overt recognition by mathematicians of the importance of scientific problems; but to miss the fact that they do splendid work even in this apparent isolation is to lose the battle before it has begun.

== Bibliography ==
- Morris Kline, Mathematics: The Loss of Certainty, Oxford University Press, 1980 ISBN 0-19-502754-X
