= Why Johnny Can't Add =

1973 book by Morris Kline

Why Johnny Can't Add: The Failure of the New Math
- Author: Morris Kline
- Subject: Criticism of "New Math" education
- Published: 1973

Why Johnny Can't Add: The Failure of the New Math is a 1973 book by Morris Kline, in which the author severely criticized the teaching practices characteristic of the "New Math" fashion for school teaching, which were based on Bourbaki's approach to mathematical research and mathematics education in the United States. Reactions were immediate, and the book became a best seller in its genre and was translated into many languages.

== See also ==
- Why Johnny Can't Read
