= New Math =

Approach to teaching mathematics in the 1950s and '60s

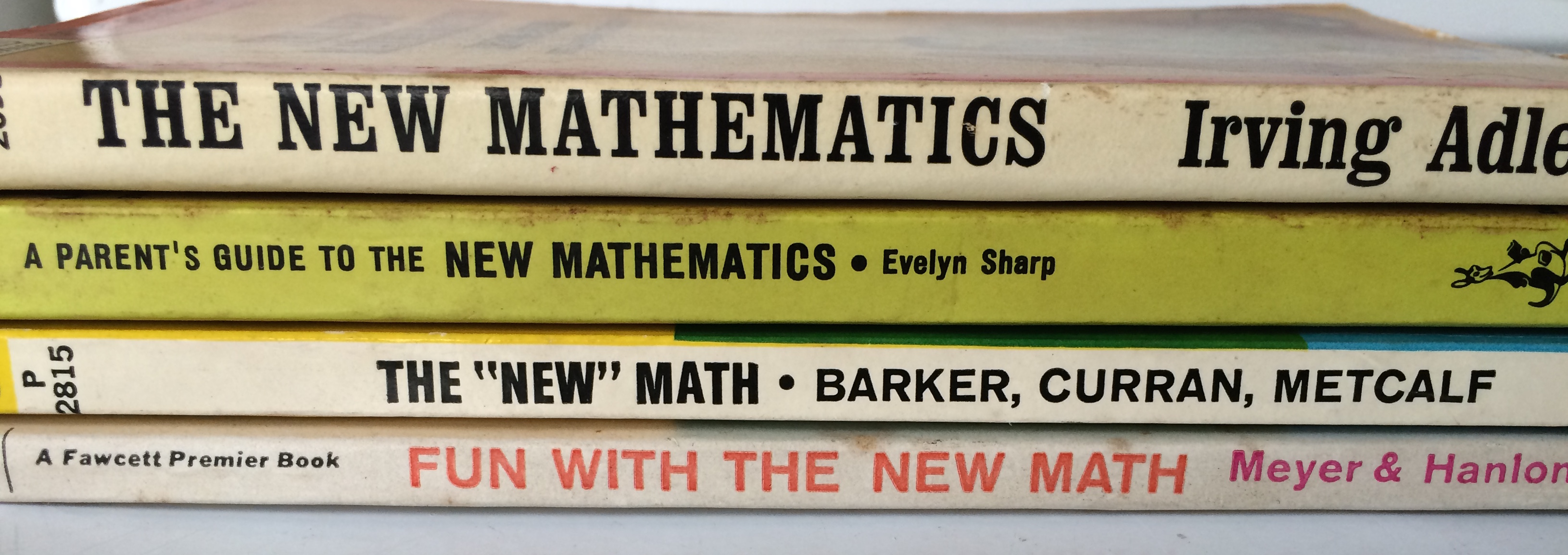
Paperback introductions to the New Math in the United States

New Mathematics or New Math was a dramatic but temporary change in the way mathematics was taught in grade schools which started in France and spread to many other countries between the 1950s and 1970s.

== Overview ==
Following World War II, the Western world underwent substantial economic and technological transformations and the training of scientists and engineers was seen as crucial for further economic growth. Furthermore, in the context of the Cold War, the launch of the world's first artificial satellite Sputnik by the Soviet Union in 1957 raised concerns that the West was falling behind. To this end, educational reforms—including in mathematics, which underlies the natural sciences and engineering—were considered necessary. In Europe, reform of school mathematical curricula was pursued by multiple countries, including the United Kingdom (particularly by the School Mathematics Project), and West Germany, where the changes were seen as part of a larger process of Bildungsreform. In the United States, the educational status quo was severely criticized as sorely lacking on substance and as a source of national humiliation, prompting Congress to introduce the National Defense Education Act of 1958, pouring enormous sums of money into not just research and development but also STEM education.

Indeed, during the postwar era, the importance of modern mathematics—especially mathematical logic, optimization, and numerical analysis—was acknowledged for its usefulness during the war. From this sprang proposals for reforms in mathematics education. The international movement to bring about such reforms was launched in the late 1950s, with heavy French influence. In France, they also grew out of a desire to bring the subject as it was taught in schools closer to the research done by pure mathematicians, particularly the Nicholas Bourbaki school, which emphasized an austere and abstract style of doing mathematics, axiomatization. (Note: Thus instead of the intuitive approach which often necessitates the memorization of rules and formulas for problem-solving, one begins with definitions and axioms then derives theorems from them. Concrete calculations are de-emphasized in favor of abstract proofs.) Until the 1950s, the purpose of primary education was to prepare students for life and future careers. This changed in the 1960s. A commission headed by André Lichnerowicz was established to work out the details of the desired reforms in mathematical education. At the same time, the French government mandated that the same courses be taught to all schoolchildren, regardless of their career prospects and aspirations. Thus the same highly abstract courses in mathematics were taught not only to those willing and able to pursue university studies, but also to those leaving school early to join the workforce.

In the New Math curriculum for traditional topics such as geometry, geometric intuition and diagrams, like this illustration of the law of sines, were eschewed in favor of an austere and abstract presentation in terms of linear algebra.

In France, from elementary school to the French Baccalaureate, traditional topics such as Euclidean geometry and calculus were de-emphasized in favor of mathematical and formal logic; (naive) set theory; abstract algebra (groups, rings, and fields); real analysis (including the construction of real numbers (Note: See Dedekind cuts and Cauchy sequences.)); complex numbers; theory of probability; number theory; and bases other than 10. (Note: See, for example, binary arithmetic, useful in computer science. Also see modular arithmetic, previously known as clockwork arithmetic.) In the case of Euclidean geometry, the use of intuition and diagrams was replaced by a formal approach using linear algebra (linear transformations and vector spaces). For example, the notion of the angle between two vectors (Note: See the properties of the dot product.) were given with no diagrams at all while complex numbers were defined in terms of matrices and fields. Keeping track of non-decimal notation required the need to distinguish numbers (values) from the numerals that represent them. This conception of mass public education was inherited from the interwar period and was taken for granted; the model for the elites was to be applied to all segments of society.

All of the New Math projects emphasized some form of learning by discovery. Students worked in groups to invent theories about problems posed in the textbooks. Materials for teachers described the classroom as "noisy." Part of the job of the teacher was to provide instructional scaffolding, that is, to move from table to table assessing the theory that each group of students had developed and "torpedo" wrong theories by providing counterexamples. For that style of teaching to be tolerable for students, they had to experience the teacher as a colleague rather than as an adversary or as someone concerned mainly with grading. New Math workshops for teachers, therefore, spent as much effort on the pedagogy as on the mathematics.

In Japan, New Math was supported by the Ministry of Education, Culture, Sports, Science and Technology (MEXT), but not without encountering problems, leading to student-centered approaches.

== Reception ==
But by the early 1970s, the New Math initiative ran into problems. Mathematicians, physicists, members of professional societies, economists, and industrial leaders criticized the reforms as being suitable for neither schoolteachers nor students. Many teachers struggled to understand the new materials, let alone teach them. Parents, who had problems helping their children with homework, also opposed the reforms. In particular, the abandonment of classical geometry and an emphasis on formalism and abstraction were the main target of complaints. One member of the Lichnerowicz Commission in France asked, "Should we teach outdated mathematics to less intelligent children?" Lichnerowicz resigned and the commission was disbanded in 1973.

The New Math was criticized by experts, too. In a 1965 essay, physicist Richard Feynman argued, "first there must be freedom of thought; second, we do not want to teach just words; and third, subjects should not be introduced without explaining the purpose or reason, or without giving any way in which the material could be really used to discover something interesting. I don't think it is worthwhile teaching such material." In a 1971 article, mathematician René Thom rejected the New Math as "a test of memory that poisons intelligence" because of its complete neglect of intuition. Despite his contempt for classical geometry (he once declared "Down with Euclid!" at a meeting), mathematician Jean Dieudonné denounced the New Math as an "aggressive and stupid" method of teaching. In his 1973 book, Why Johnny Can't Add: the Failure of the New Math, mathematician and historian of mathematics Morris Kline observed that it was "practically impossible" to learn new mathematical creations without first understanding the old ones, and that "abstraction is not the first stage, but the last stage, in a mathematical development." Kline criticized the authors of the New Math textbooks, not for their mathematical faculty, but rather their narrow approach to mathematics, and their limited understanding of pedagogy and educational psychology. Mathematician and author George F. Simmons wrote in the algebra section of his textbook Precalculus Mathematics in a Nutshell (1981) that by focusing on form rather than substance, the New Math produced students who had "heard of the commutative law, but did not know the multiplication table." Mathematician Laurent Schwartz described the new reforms as "very poor" pedagogy. For him, "The goal of mathematics is not to prove rigorously things that everyone knows. Instead, the goal is to find rich results and then, in order to make sure they are true, to prove them." Mathematician Gustave Choquet explained that the results of the New Math were "bound to be catastrophic" as it ignored the previous knowledge, needs, and motivation of students, the training of teachers, and the writing of suitable textbooks. Nor were there any attempts to apply mathematics to the sciences and engineering disciplines.

In 1999, Time magazine placed New Math on a list of the 100 worst ideas of the 20th century.

== Legacy ==
By the end of the 1970s, the New Math was all but abandoned. Subsequent curricula were less ambitious and carried less content. Traditional topics were reinstated. Abstraction and rigorous proofs were supplanted by intuition and calculations. But this "counter-reform" attracted its share of criticisms as teaching students very little and mostly easy topics.

For all the scathing criticisms that it has received for the New Math initiative, the influence of the Bourbaki school in mathematical education lived on, as the Soviet mathematician Vladimir Arnold recalled in a 1995 interview. Teaching in the USSR did not experience the extreme upheavals as seen in other countries, while being kept in tune, both with the applications and academic trends:

Under A. N. Kolmogorov, the mathematics committee declared a reform of the curricula of grades 4–10, at the time when the school system consisted of 10 grades. The committee found the type of reform in progress in Western countries to be unacceptable; for example, no special topic for sets was accepted for inclusion in school textbooks. Transformation approaches were accepted in teaching geometry, but not to such sophisticated level [sic] presented in the textbook produced by Vladimir Boltyansky and Isaak Yaglom.

In the United States, an enduring contribution of the New Math initiative was the addition of calculus in high school. (See Advanced Placement Calculus.)

== In popular culture ==
"New Math" (1965)
Musician and mathematician Tom Lehrer satirised New Math through song.

- Musician and university mathematics lecturer Tom Lehrer wrote a satirical song named "New Math" (from his 1965 album That Was the Year That Was), which revolved around the process of subtracting 173 from 342 in decimal and octal. The song is in the style of a lecture about the general concept of subtraction with positional notation in an arbitrary base, illustrated by two simple calculations, and highlights the New Math's emphasis on insight and abstract concepts – as Lehrer sardonically put it, "In the new approach ... the important thing is to understand what you're doing, rather than to get the right answer." At one point in the song, he notes that "you've got thirteen and you take away seven, and that leaves five... well, six, actually, but the idea is the important thing." The chorus pokes fun at parents' frustration and confusion over the entire method: "Hooray for New Math, New Math / It won't do you a bit of good to review math / It's so simple, so very simple / That only a child can do it."
- In 1965, cartoonist Charles Schulz authored a series of Peanuts strips, which detailed kindergartener Sally's frustrations with New Math. In the first strip, she is depicted puzzling over "sets, one-to-one matching, equivalent sets, non-equivalent sets, sets of one, sets of two, renaming two, subsets, joining sets, number sentences, placeholders." Eventually, she bursts into tears and exclaims, "All I want to know is, how much is two and two?" This series of strips was later adapted for the 1973 Peanuts animated special There's No Time for Love, Charlie Brown. Schulz also drew a one-panel illustration of Charlie Brown at his school desk exclaiming, "How can you do 'New Math' problems with an 'Old Math' mind?"
- In the 1966 Hazel episode "A Little Bit of Genius", the show tackles the division that the introduction of New Math wrought between families, friends, and neighbors and its impact on the then ever-widening generation gap.

== See also ==
- Chicago movement
- Common core
- Comprehensive School Mathematics Program (CSMP)
- List of abandoned education methods
- New New Math – a satirical term for the Math Wars of the 1990s
- School Mathematics Project: UK version in use 1960s–1980s
- School Mathematics Study Group (SMSG)
- Secondary School Mathematics Curriculum Improvement Study (SSMCIS)
