= Iris Runge =

German mathematician and physicist

Iris Anna Runge
- Born: 1 June 1888; Hanover, German Empire
- Died: 27 January 1966 (aged 77); Ulm, West Germany
- Citizenship: German
- Education: University of Göttingen
- Scientific career
- Fields: Applied mathematics, physics
- Workplaces: LMU Munich, Osram, Telefunken, Technische Universität Berlin, Humboldt University of Berlin
- Thesis: Über Diffusion im festen Zustande ("On diffusion in the solid state") (1921)
- Doctoral advisor: Gustav Tammann
- Other academic advisors: Arnold Sommerfeld

Iris Anna Runge (1 June 1888 – 27 January 1966) was a German applied mathematician and physicist.

== Life and work ==
Iris Runge was the eldest of six children of mathematician Carl Runge. She started studying physics, mathematics, and geography at the University of Göttingen in 1907, with the aim of becoming a teacher. At that time, she only attended the lectures, since women were not allowed to formally study at Prussian universities until 1908–1909. She attended lectures given by her father and spent a semester at LMU Munich working with Arnold Sommerfeld, which led to her first publication, Anwendungen der Vektorrechnung auf die Grundlagen der Geometrischen Optik ("Applications of vector calculations to the fundamentals of geometric optics") in Annalen der Physik ("Annals of Physics"). After passing her state exams (higher teachers' exam) in 1912, she taught at several schools (Lyzeum Göttingen, Oberlyzeum Kippenberg near Bremen). She went back to the university in 1918 to study chemistry. She took the supplementary examination for teachers in 1920. In 1920, she worked as a teacher at Schule Schloss Salem. She received her doctorate in 1921 under the supervision of Gustav Tammann, with a dissertation titled Über Diffusion im festen Zustande ("On diffusion in the solid state"). As a student, she was a personal assistant to Leonard Nelson. During the political upheaval in Germany after the First World War she was active in the election campaign of the Sozialdemokratische Partei Deutschlands (Social Democratic Party of Germany, SPD), which at that time implemented women's suffrage in Germany. She joined the party in 1929.

In 1923, she gave up teaching and worked at Osram as an industrial mathematician. Ellen Lax, who obtained her doctorate in 1919 under Walther Nernst, was Runge's colleague there. There, in accordance with the company's products (light bulbs and radio tubes), she worked on heat conduction problems, electron emission in tubes, and statistics for quality control in mass production. On the last topic Runge co-authored a then-standard textbook. In 1929, she was promoted to a senior company official. From 1929 she was in the radio tubes department, and after the department was acquired by Telefunken in 1939, she moved to work in the new company until the dissolution of the laboratory in 1945.

After 1945, she taught at the adult education center in Spandau and was a research assistant at Technische Universität Berlin. In 1947, she qualified as a professor at the Humboldt University of Berlin. Her inaugural lecture was titled Über das Rauschen von Elektronenröhren ("On the noise in electron tubes"); her published works were accepted in lieu of a habilitation thesis. In 1947, she was offered a teaching position there, and she worked until 1949 as an assistant to Friedrich Möglich, the chair of the theoretical physics division at Humboldt University. In November 1949 she was appointed as a lecturer, and in July 1950 she became a professor with a teaching assignment. She was one of three women professors in the Faculty of Mathematics and Natural Sciences, the other two being Elisabeth Schiemann and Katharina Boll-Dornberger. From March 1949, she also worked part-time again for Telefunken. In 1952, she became an emeritus professor at Humboldt University, where she gave lectures on theoretical physics until the summer semester of 1952. She lived in West Berlin until 1965, and then moved to live with her brother in Ulm.

She translated the book What Is Mathematics? by Richard Courant (who was married to one of her sisters) and Herbert Robbins into German, and wrote a biography of her father, Carl Runge und sein wissenschaftliches Werk ("Carl Runge and his scientific works").

== Publications ==
- Arnold Sommerfeld, Iris Runge, Anwendungen der Vektorrechnung auf die Grundlagen der Geometrischen Optik ("Applications of vector calculations to the fundamentals of geometric optics"), Annalen der Physik, Vol. 340, 1911, pp. 277–298
- Richard Becker, Hubert Plaut, Iris Runge, Anwendungen der mathematischen Statistik auf Probleme der Massenfabrikation ("Applications of mathematical statistics to problems of mass production"), Springer Verlag 1927
- Iris Runge, Carl Runge und sein wissenschaftliches Werk ("Carl Runge and his scientific works"), Vandenhoeck and Ruprecht, Göttingen, 1949 (reprinted from Abh. Akad. Wiss. Göttingen)
