= David Fahrenthold =

American journalist (born 1978)

David A. Fahrenthold
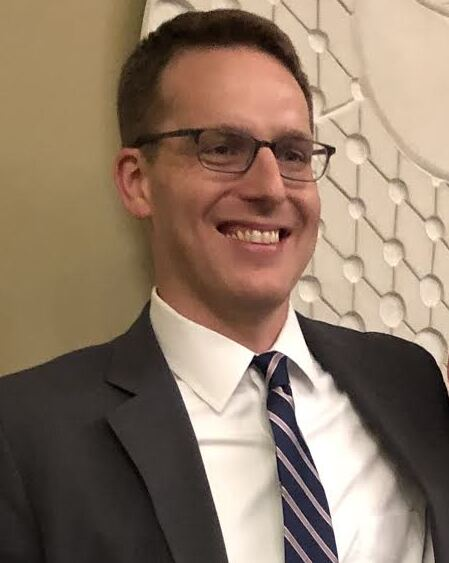
- Fahrenthold in 2019
- Born: January 3, 1978 (age 48); Houston, Texas, U.S.
- Education: Harvard University (BA)
- Occupation: Reporter
- Spouse: Elizabeth Lewis (m. 2005)
- Family: Harry R. Lewis (father-in-law)
- Awards: Pulitzer Prize for National Reporting (2017)
- Website: Official website

David A. Fahrenthold (born January 3, 1978) is an American journalist who writes for The New York Times. Previously he wrote for The Washington Post. He has also served as a political analyst for NBC News and MSNBC. In 2017, he was awarded the Pulitzer Prize for National Reporting for his coverage of Donald Trump and his alleged charitable givings, including the 2016 United States presidential election.

== Early life and education ==
Fahrenthold was born to Jeane and Peter Fahrenthold of Houston, Texas. His mother is a teacher at Bunker Hill Elementary School (Texas) and his father a director of risk management. He was raised Methodist.

He attended Memorial High School, where he wrote for the student newspaper, Anvil, and was the captain of the 1996 academic challenge national championship team.

Fahrenthold attended Harvard University, where he was the associate managing editor at The Harvard Crimson. He graduated magna cum laude in 2000 with a degree in history.

== Career ==
Fahrenthold joined the staff of The Washington Post in 2000, where he has covered the District of Columbia Metropolitan Police Department, the U.S. Congress, and the federal government.

He later covered the New England region and environmental issues for the Post before moving onto the political team in 2010.

He was a CNN contributor from January 2017 to February 2018, when he became a political analyst for NBC News and MSNBC.

In January 2022, Fahrenthold tweeted that he had started working at The New York Times "as an investigative reporter focused on the world of nonprofits."

== 2016 presidential election ==
According to a 2018 study, Fahrentold was the third-most frequently mentioned individual or organization in Twitter discussions about Trump during the 2016 election, behind Trump himself and CNN.

=== Reporting on Donald Trump donation claims and the Trump Foundation ===
Fahrenthold covered the 2016 U.S. presidential campaign, reporting on the Donald J. Trump Foundation as well as claims Trump made as the 2016 Republican nominee that he had given away millions out of his own pocket. In May 2016, Fahrenthold began an effort to verify Trump had made these personal donations. To solicit leads and for transparency, he periodically posted updates to Twitter via a handwritten list of charities he had contacted to ask whether they had received contributions from Trump, as well as the charities' responses. After four months, Fahrenthold and colleagues at the Post had contacted more than 400 major charities, with only one charity confirming they had received a personal donation from Trump between 2008 and May 2016 when Fahrenthold began publicly reporting on the question.

Following Fahrenthold's reporting, the New York attorney general opened an inquiry into the Trump Foundation's fundraising practices, and ultimately issued a "notice of violation" ordering the Foundation to stop raising money in New York. The Poynter Institute described Fahrenthold as "one of the journalism stars of the 2016 campaign due to a string of revelations about Donald Trump's charitable giving (or lack of same)". CNN senior media correspondent Brian Stelter said: "Some have dubbed [Fahrenthold's work] Pulitzer worthy. Its impact was reinforced on Tuesday [September 13, 2016] when President Obama cited the reporting while stumping for Hillary Clinton."

On April 10, 2017, Fahrenthold won the Pulitzer Prize for National Reporting for his work on Donald Trump's charity claims casting "doubt on Donald Trump's assertions of generosity toward charities".

=== Reporting on the Trump Access Hollywood video ===
On October 7, 2016, Fahrenthold broke news of a 2005 Access Hollywood video recording Donald Trump making what Politico characterized as "lewd comments about groping women"; among other remarks, Trump said that his celebrity allowed him to "grab them by the pussy" without consequence. An unnamed source called Fahrenthold at 11 that morning and informed him of the tape's existence; at 4 that afternoon, Fahrenthold published the tape and a reported story on it in The Washington Post. The newspaper said it became "the most concurrently viewed article in the history of The Post's website".

The story broke two days before the second of the 2016 U.S. presidential campaign debates between Trump and Democratic rival Hillary Clinton. Staff at Access Hollywood, owned by NBC, had found the tape earlier in the week, and the show was working on a story but did not plan to run it until the following Monday, the day after the debate. Once Fahrenthold broke the story at the Post, both Access Hollywood and NBC News ran stories the same night.

=== Reporting on Secret Service payments to the Trump Organization ===
In August 2020, Fahrenthold and other Washington Post reporters published an investigative journalism piece showing that the Secret Service spent more than $900,000 at properties owned by Trump during his presidency. After the reporting, White House spokesperson Judd Deere said the White House was building a "dossier" on Fahrenthold.

== Personal life ==
In 2005, Fahrenthold married Elizabeth Lewis; the two met while attending Harvard. Lewis's father is Harry R. Lewis, computer science professor and former dean of Harvard College; her mother is Marlyn McGrath Lewis, former director of admissions for Harvard College.

== Awards ==
- 2017 – Pulitzer Prize for National Reporting ($15,000)
- 2017 – Toner Prize for Excellence in Political Reporting ($5,000)
- 2017 – Hillman Prize for Newspaper Journalism

== Books ==
- David A. Fahrenthold (2017). Uncovering Trump: The Truth Behind Donald Trump's Charitable Giving. Diversion Books. ISBN 978-1635761597.
- David A. Fahrenthold (2011). Chesapeake: The Aerial Photography of Cameron Davidson. University of Virginia Press. ISBN 978-0984162000.
