= David Leinweber =

American computer scientist

David Leinweber heads the Lawrence Berkeley National Laboratory Computational Research Division's Center for Innovative Financial Technology, created to help build a bridge between the computational science and financial markets communities.

He was a Haas Fellow in Finance at the University of California, Berkeley, from 2008-2010.

== Early life and education ==
Dr. Leinweber graduated from MIT, in physics and computer science. He also has a Ph.D. in Applied Mathematics from Harvard University. He came to Harvard planning to study computer graphics, but discovered that the computer graphics courses there were no longer being taught; his "de facto advisor", Harry R. Lewis, encouraged him to study more broadly, and he ended up taking financial mathematics courses from the Harvard Business School. Later, Lewis's connections with the RAND Corporation helped him find a place there as his first post-graduate employer.

== Career ==
Leinweber is internationally known for ironically showing that S&P 500 could be "predicted" by demonstrating that the butter production in Bangladesh correlated with the S&P 500 with 75% accuracy from 1981-1993 (an R^{2} of 0.75); including American cheese production improved the illusory correlation to 95%, and including American and Bangladeshi sheep populations improved the fit to 99%. Leinweber thus illustrated, tongue in cheek, how indiscriminate data mining, overfitting, and even apophenia may affect market predictions.

== Book ==
He wrote the book Nerds on Wall Street: Math, Machines and Wired Markets (Wiley 2009).
