= Mathematics and the Search for Knowledge =

1985 book by Morris Kline

- Author: Morris Kline
- Subject: Mathematics and physics
- Genre: Non-fiction
- Publisher: Oxford University Press
- Publication date: 1985
- Publication place: New York
- Pages: 266
- ISBN: 0-19-503533-X
- Preceded by: Mathematics: The Loss of Certainty

Mathematics and the Search for Knowledge is a 1985 book by Morris Kline about the role of mathematics in understanding physical reality. It is preceded by Mathematics: The Loss of Certainty (1980).

== Overview ==
Kline gives an outline of the development of physics, beginning from ancient Greek astronomy. He explains that modern physics (consisting of theories such as electromagnetism, relativity and quantum mechanics) differs from previous fields such as Newtonian mechanics in that it consists of purely mathematical models that cannot be intuitively visualized. Further, unlike sensory perception, modern theories have provided predictions that have been verified and are immune to sensory illusions. Kline argues that it is mathematics, not human senses, that provides a true understanding of physical reality.

== Contents ==
- Historical Overview: Is There an External World?
- I. The Failings of the Senses and Intuition
- II. The Rise and Role of Mathematics
- III. The Astronomical Worlds of the Greeks
- IV. The Heliocentric Theory of Copernicus and Kepler
- V. Mathematics Dominates Physical Science
- VI. Mathematics and the Mystery of Gravitation
- VII. Mathematics and the Imperceptible Electromagnetic World
- VIII. A Prelude to the Theory of Relativity
- IX. The Relativistic World
- X. The Dissolution of Matter: Quantum Theory
- XI. The Reality of Mathematical Physics
- XII. Why Does Mathematics Work?
- XIII. Mathematics and Nature's Behavior
- Bibliography
- Index

== Bibliography ==
- Calinger, Ronald L. (1990). "Review of Mathematics and the Search for Knowledge". Isis. 81 (1): 87–88. doi:10.1086/355257. JSTOR 234091.
- Hersh, Reuben (March 1987). "Review of Mathematics and the Search for Knowledge". The American Mathematical Monthly. 94 (3): 314–315. doi:10.2307/2323410. JSTOR 2323410.
- Peak, Philip (September 1987). "Review of Mathematics and the Search for Knowledge (L, P)". The Mathematics Teacher. 80 (6): 496. JSTOR 27965470.
