= List of abandoned education methods =

This is a list of education practices which have been replaced by or abandoned in favor of newer (or older) practices. To maintain a balanced point of view, each example should provide a source showing that the practice was abandoned or replaced. A practice abandoned by one school, for example reform mathematics, may still be in adoption by other schools, so opposing methods may both appear on this list at different times or schools.

- One-room schools: The advent of school buses and better transportation led to consolidating schools into larger buildings in the early 20th century, while remote learning improvements in the 21st century further reduced the need for the remaining ones. Such schools are now rare in developed countries.
- A-b-c-darianism: an archaic approach to teaching the alphabet in one-room schools, phased out by the 1860s.
- New Math: abandoned and discredited by the late 1960s.
- Open classroom: some schools still use this model, but no longer as predominant as it was in the 1960s and 1970s.
- American Indian boarding schools, as well as the related Canadian Indian residential school system: Designed to assimilate Native American (First Nations) youth into North American culture and society, the practice was largely discontinued in the U.S. with the Indian Self-Determination and Education Assistance Act of 1975, as the frequently heavy-handed approach was often fatal, in turn contributed to an ongoing hostility toward the process.
- Look-say: The predominant form of American early reading instruction of the mid-20th century, typified by the Dick and Jane readers, but abandoned in favor of phonics.
- Whole language: Popular in the 1980s and early 1990s but abandoned in favor of phonics.
- Initial Teaching Alphabet: this 1957 regularization of standard English spelling was intended to permit exception-free learning of the rules, yet was strongly reminiscent of traditional spelling, and was intended to allow easy transition to the latter. (See also Unifon, which had similar structure and intent.) The extra letters in fact had the opposite effect of confusing young readers, and by the 1960s, the issue of distinguishing the multiple sounds assigned to one letter was addressed with other methods such as Words in Colour and diacritical marks.
