= William Gasarch =

American computer scientist

William Ian Gasarch
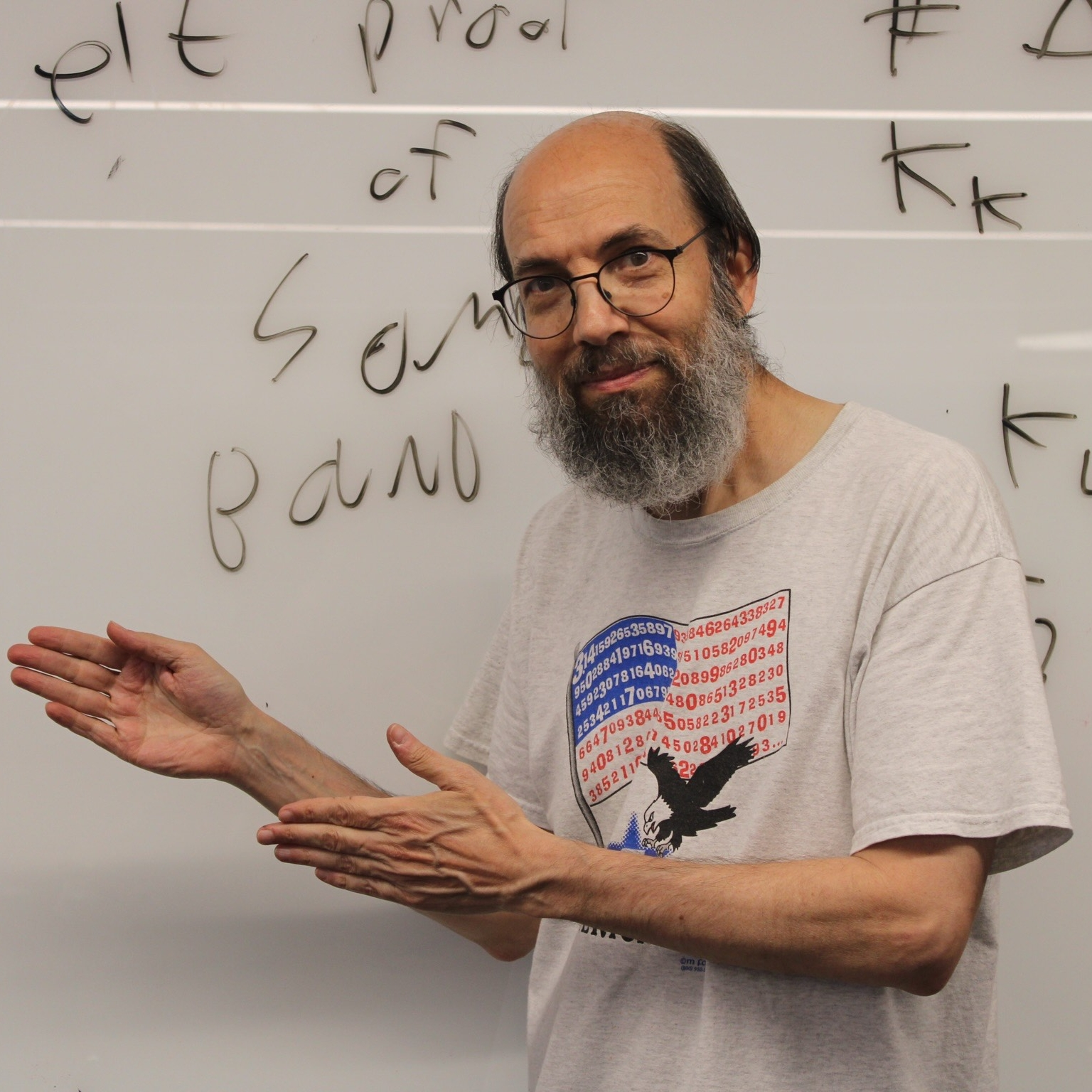
- Professor Bill Gasarch at UMD
- Born: 1959 (age 66–67)
- Education: Stony Brook University; Harvard University
- Known for: Computational complexity theory Computability theory Computational learning theory Ramsey theory
- Scientific career
- Fields: Computer science
- Workplaces: University of Maryland, College Park
- Doctoral advisor: Harry R. Lewis
- Website: www.cs.umd.edu/~gasarch http://blog.computationalcomplexity.org/

William Ian Gasarch (/ɡəˈsɑːrʃ/ gə-SARSH; born 1959) is an American computer scientist known for his work in computational complexity theory, computability theory, computational learning theory, and Ramsey theory. He is currently a professor at the University of Maryland Department of Computer Science with an affiliate appointment in Mathematics.

Gasarch is a frequent mentor of high school student research projects; one of these, with Jacob Lurie, won the 1996 Westinghouse Science Talent Search for Lurie. He has co-blogged on computational complexity with Lance Fortnow since 2007. He was book review editor for ACM SIGACT NEWS from 1997 to 2015.

== Education ==
Gasarch received his doctorate in computer science from Harvard in 1985, advised by Harry R. Lewis. His thesis was titled Recursion-Theoretic Techniques in Complexity Theory and Combinatorics. He was hired into a tenure track professorial job at the University of Maryland in the Fall of 1985. He was promoted to associate professor with tenure in 1991, and to full professor in 1998.

== Work ==
Gasarch co-founded (with Richard Beigel) the field of Bounded Queries in Recursion Theory and has written many papers in the area capped off by a book on the topic co-authored with Georgia Martin, titled Bounded Queries in Recursion Theory. He has published books such as Problems with a Point, a book with a broad view on mathematics and theoretical computer science which he co-authored with Clyde Kruskal and includes works by other professors such as David Eppstein. He also co-founded the subfield of recursion-theoretic inductive inference named Learning via Queries with Carl Smith. More recently he has been more involved with combinatorics, notably Ramsey Theory. He has written three surveys of what theorists think of the P vs NP problem: in 2002, 2012, and 2019. In 2020 he wrote Mathematical Muffin Morsels: Nobody Wants a Small Piece with Erik Metz, Jacob Prinz, and Daniel Smolyak.

== Blog ==
Lance Fortnow began writing a blog on theoretical computer science with an emphasis on complexity theory in 2002. Gasarch was a frequent guest blogger until 2007 when he became an official co-blogger.
