= Edward Kasner =

American mathematician (1878–1955)

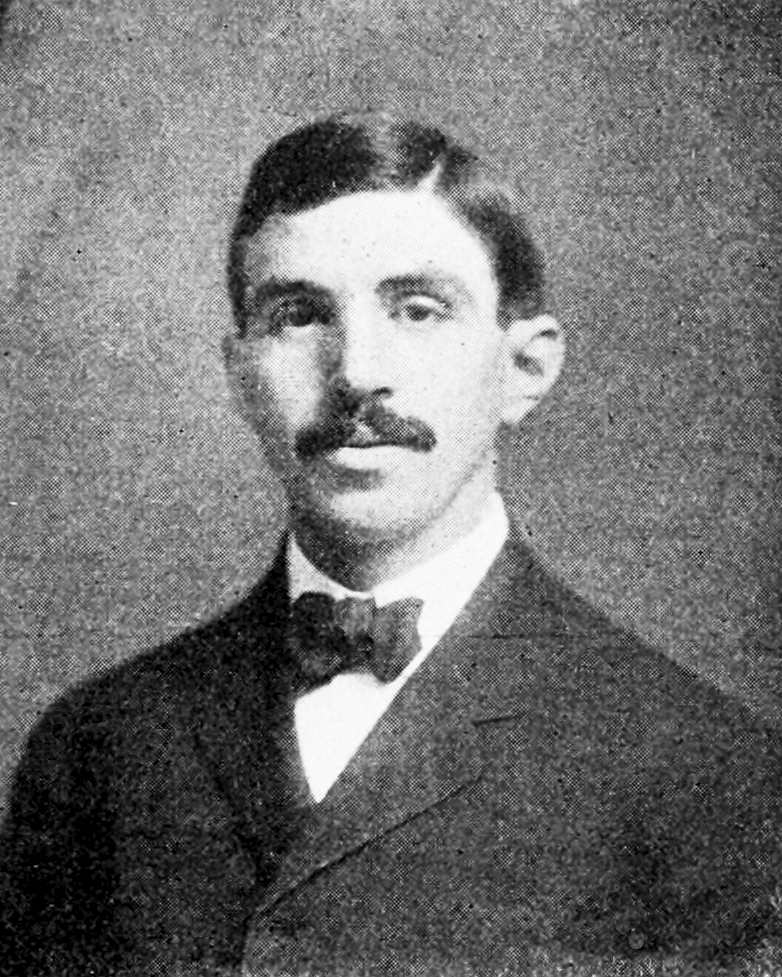
- Kasner in 1907
- Born: April 2, 1878; New York City, U.S.
- Died: January 7, 1955 (aged 76); New York City, U.S.
- Education: CCNY (BA); Columbia University (MA, PhD)
- Known for: Kasner metric Kasner polygon Apollonian gasket Googol
- Awards: Colloquium Lecture (1909)
- Scientific career
- Fields: Mathematics
- Workplaces: Columbia University
- Thesis: The Invariant Theory of the Inversion Group: Geometry upon a Quadric Surface (1899)
- Doctoral advisor: Frank Nelson Cole
- Other academic advisors: Felix Klein; David Hilbert
- Doctoral students: Rufus Isaacs; Joseph Ritt; Jesse Douglas; Edna Kramer

Edward Kasner (April 2, 1878 – January 7, 1955) was an American mathematician best known for introducing the term googol for 10^{100}. He was a Professor of Mathematics at Columbia University — the first Jewish person appointed to a faculty position in the sciences at Columbia — specializing in differential geometry. Kasner is also known for the Kasner metric and the Kasner polygon.

== Biography ==
Edward Kasner was born on April 2, 1878 in New York City to Fanny Ritterman and Bernard Kasner, Jewish Austrian immigrants. He was the sixth of eight children. He attended Public School 2 in Manhattan and the City College of New York from 1891 to 1896.

Kasner's 1899 PhD dissertation at Columbia University was titled The Invariant Theory of the Inversion Group: Geometry upon a Quadric Surface; it was published by the American Mathematical Society in 1900 in their Transactions. He was one of the first recipients of a doctorate in mathematics from Columbia. He spent 1899-1900 in Göttingen studying under Felix Klein and David Hilbert.

Kasner was appointed tutor in Mathematics in the Columbia University Mathematics Department in 1900. Subsequently, he became an adjunct professor in 1906, and a full professor in 1910, at the university. In 1937 he was appointed chair of the department.

Kasner died January 7, 1955 in New York City.

== Googol and googolplex ==
Kasner is perhaps best remembered today for introducing the term googol for 10^{100}. In order to pique the interest of children, Kasner sought a name for a very large number: one followed by 100 zeros. On a walk in the New Jersey Palisades with his nephews, Milton (1911–1981) and Edwin Sirotta, Kasner asked for their ideas. Nine-year-old Milton suggested that term.

In 1940, with James R. Newman, Kasner co-wrote a non-technical book surveying the field of mathematics, called Mathematics and the Imagination (ISBN 0-486-41703-4). It was in this book that the term googol was first popularized:

Words of wisdom are spoken by children at least as often as by scientists. The name "googol" was invented by a child (Dr. Kasner's nine-year-old nephew) who was asked to think up a name for a very big number, namely, 1 with a hundred zeros after it. He was very certain that this number was not infinite, and therefore equally certain that it had to have a name. At the same time that he suggested "googol" he gave a name for a still larger number: "Googolplex." A googolplex is much larger than a googol, but is still finite, as the inventor of the name was quick to point out. It was suggested that a googolplex should be 1, followed by writing zeros until you get tired. This is a description of what would happen if one actually tried to write a googolplex, but different people get tired at different times and it would never do to have Carnera a better mathematician than Dr. Einstein, simply because he had more endurance. The googolplex then, is a specific finite number, with so many zeros after the 1 that the number is a googol. A googolplex is much bigger than a googol. You will get some idea of the size of this very large but finite number from the fact that there would not be enough room to write it, if you went to the farthest star, touring all the nebulae and putting down zeros every inch of the way.

—

The Internet search engine "Google" originated from a misspelling of googol, and the "Googleplex" (the Google company headquarters in Mountain View, California) is similarly derived from googolplex, 10 to the power of googol.

== Works ==
- Kasner, E. (1900). "The Invariant Theory of the Inversion Group: Geometry Upon a Quadric Surface". Transactions of the American Mathematical Society. 1 (4): 430–498. doi:10.1090/S0002-9947-1900-1500550-1. hdl:2027/miun.abv0510.0001.001. JSTOR 1986367.
- Kasner, Edward (1980) [1934]. "Differential-geometric aspects of dynamics". In C. Carpelan; A. Parpola; P. Koskikallio (eds.). The Logarithmic potential and other monographs. New York: Chelsea. pp. 235–263. ISBN 0-8284-0305-8.
- Kasner, Edward; Newman, James R. (April 2001) [London: Penguin, 1940; New York: Simon and Schuster, 1967]. Mathematics and the Imagination. Dover Pubns. ISBN 0-486-41703-4.
- Edward Kasner and James R. Newman, Mathematics and the Imagination, Tempus Books of Microsoft Press, 1989. ISBN 1-55615-104-7
- Kasner, Edward (July 1914). "The Ratio of the Arc to the Chord of an Analytic Curve Need Not Be Unity". Bulletin of the American Mathematical Society. 20 (10): 524–31. doi:10.1090/S0002-9904-1914-02545-5.
- Kasner, Edward (1921). "Geometrical theorems on Einstein's cosmological equations". Amer. J. Math. 43 (4). The Johns Hopkins University Press: 217–221. Bibcode:1921AmJM...43..217K. doi:10.2307/2370192. JSTOR 2370192.
