= Googol =

Large number defined as ten to the 100th power

A googol is the large number 10^{100} or ten to the power of one hundred. In decimal notation, it is written as the digit 1 followed by one hundred zeros: 10,000,000,000,000,000,000,000,000,000,000,000,000,000,000,000,000,000,000,000,000,000,000,000,000,000,000,000,000,000,000,000,000,000. Its systematic name is ten duotrigintillion (short scale) or ten sexdecilliard (long scale). Its prime factorization is 2^{100} × 5^{100}.

== Etymology ==
The term was coined in 1920 by nine-year-old Milton Sirotta (1911–1981), nephew of American mathematician Edward Kasner. He may have been inspired by the contemporary comic strip character Barney Google. Kasner popularized the concept in his 1940 book Mathematics and the Imagination. Other names for this quantity include ten duotrigintillion on the short scale (commonly used in English–speaking countries), ten thousand sexdecillion on the long scale, or ten sexdecilliard on the Peletier long scale.

== Size ==
A googol has no special significance in mathematics. However, it is useful when comparing with other very large quantities, such as the number of subatomic particles in the visible universe or the number of hypothetical possibilities in a chess game. Kasner used it to illustrate the difference between an unimaginably large number and infinity, and in this role it is sometimes used in teaching mathematics. To put in perspective the size of a googol, the mass of an electron, just under 10^{−30} kg, can be compared to the mass of the visible universe, estimated at between 10^{50} and 10^{60} kg. It is a ratio in the order of about 10^{80} to 10^{90}, or at most one ten-billionth of a googol (0.00000001% of a googol).

Carl Sagan pointed out that the total number of elementary particles in the observable universe is around 10^{80} (the Eddington number) and that if the whole universe were packed with neutrons so that there would be no empty space anywhere, there would be around 10^{128}. He also noted the similarity of the second calculation to that of Archimedes in The Sand Reckoner. By Archimedes's calculation, the universe of Aristarchus (roughly 2 light years in diameter), if fully packed with sand, would contain 10^{63} grains. If the much larger observable universe of today were filled with sand, it would still only equal 10^{95} grains. The number would have to be 100,000 times bigger to make a googol.

The decay time for a supermassive black hole of roughly 1 galaxy-mass (10^{11} solar masses) due to Hawking radiation is on the order of 10^{100} years. Therefore, the heat death of an expanding universe is lower-bounded to occur at least one googol years in the future.

A googol is considerably smaller than a centillion.

== Properties ==
A googol is approximately equal to $70!\approx1.1979\times10^{100}$ (factorial of 70). Using an integral, binary numeral system, one would need 333 bits to represent a googol, i.e., $10^{100}=2^{(100/\mathrm{log}_{10}2)}\approx2^{332.19280949}$. However, a googol is well within the maximum bounds of an IEEE 754 double-precision floating point type without full precision in the mantissa.

Using modular arithmetic, the series of residues (mod n) of one googol, starting with mod 1, is as follows:

0, 0, 1, 0, 0, 4, 4, 0, 1, 0, 1, 4, 3, 4, 10, 0, 4, 10, 9, 0, 4, 12, 13, 16, 0, 16, 10, 4, 16, 10, 5, 0, 1, 4, 25, 28, 10, 28, 16, 0, 1, 4, 31, 12, 10, 36, 27, 16, 11, 0, ... (sequence A066298 in the OEIS)

This sequence is the same as that of the residues (mod n) of a googolplex up until the 17th position.

== Cultural impact ==
Googol is a homophone of the company name Google, an intentional misspelling of "googol" by the company's founders; it suggests that the search engine provides large quantities of information. In 2004, Kasner's heirs considered suing Google over their use of "googol"; however, no suit was ever filed.

Since October 2009, Google has used the domain "1e100.net", "1e100" being E notation for 1 googol, to identify servers across its network.

"Googol" was the £1 million answer in a 2001 episode of the British Who Wants to Be a Millionaire?, which the contestant allegedly won by cheating.

A 1976 Richie Rich comic strip featured "The Googol", a masked villain so named because he had once been a US pilot pursued by 100 Zeros in the Second World War.

== See also ==
- Googolplex
- Graham's number
- Infinity
- Names of large numbers
- Orders of magnitude (numbers)
- Skewes' number
