= Harry R. Lewis =

American computer scientist (born 1947)

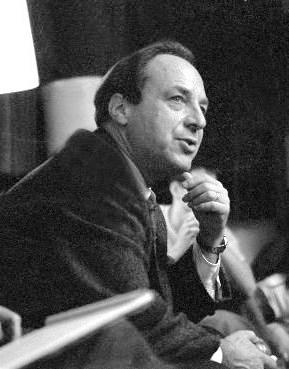
- Harry Lewis in 2002

Dean of Harvard College
- In office July 5, 1995 – June 30, 2003
- Preceded by: L. Fred Jewett
- Succeeded by: Benedict Gross

Personal details
- Born: 1947 (age 78–79) Boston, Massachusetts, U.S.
- Spouse: Marlyn McGrath (m. 1968)
- Relations: David Fahrenthold (son-in-law)
- Children: 2
- Scientific career
- Education: Harvard University (AB, AM, PhD)
- Title: Gordon McKay Professor of Computer Science (1981–present)
- Fields: Computer science Mathematical logic
- Workplaces: Harvard School of Engineering and Applied Sciences
- Thesis: Herbrand Expansions and Reductions of the Decision Problem (1974)
- Doctoral advisor: Burton Dreben
- Doctoral students: William Gasarch; John Reif
- Other notable students: Bill Gates (Note: Gates was a sophomore in Lewis' combinatorics class when Lewis posed the pancake sorting problem as "an example of a problem that was easy to describe but [nonetheless] had not been solved". Gates brought a solution to Lewis a few days afterward, and later published it with the assistance of Christos Papadimitriou, an assistant professor at Harvard at the time.); David Leinweber (Note: Leinweber became a financial analyst after joining the Harvard applied mathematics graduate program intending to study computer graphics, but discovering that the graphics courses were no longer taught. Lewis became his "de facto advisor", steered him to broader studies, and (through his connections with the RAND Corporation) helped get him his first job.); Margo Seltzer (Note: Seltzer worked for Lewis as an undergraduate teaching assistant in a course that, years later, she herself taught after joining the Harvard faculty.); Salil Vadhan (Note: Vadhan writes that taking Lewis' course as an undergraduate "opened my eyes to the deep and beautiful theory on which computer science is built ... What I found extraordinary ... was that students could learn about open problems at the frontier of the field – basic problems that we aren't even close to solving – in an introductory course." Later, a 2004 sabbatical by Lewis gave Vadhan the chance to teach the same course himself.); Mark Zuckerberg (Note: In 2004 Zuckerberg wrote to Lewis, Professor, I've been interested in graph theory and its applications to social networks for a while now, so I did some research ... that has to do with linking people through articles they appear in from [The Crimson, the Harvard student newspaper]. I thought people would find this interesting, so I've set up a preliminary site that allows people to find the connection (through people and articles) from any person to the most frequently mentioned person in the time frame I looked at. That person is you. I wanted to ask your permission to put this site up though, since it has your name in its title. After some discussion Lewis gave his approval: "Sure, what the hell. Seems harmless.")
- Uniformed service
- Allegiance: United States
- Branch: U.S. Public Health Service Commissioned Corps
- Service years: 1968 - 1970
- Rank: Lieutenant (junior grade)
- Website: https://people.seas.harvard.edu/~lewis/

Harry Roy Lewis (born 1947) is an American computer scientist, mathematician, and university administrator known for his research in computational logic, textbooks in theoretical computer science, and writings on computing, higher education, and technology. He is Gordon McKay Research Professor of Computer Science at Harvard University, and was Dean of Harvard College from 1995 to 2003.

Essentially all of Lewis's career has been at Harvard, where he has been honored for his "particularly distinguished contributions to undergraduate teaching"; his students have included future entrepreneurs Bill Gates and Mark Zuckerberg, and numerous future faculty members at Harvard and other schools. The website "Six Degrees to Harry Lewis", created by Zuckerberg while at Harvard, was a precursor to Facebook.

== Education and career ==
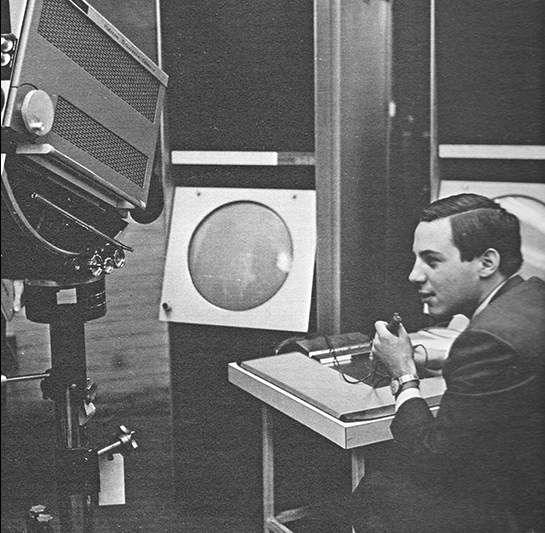
Lewis demonstrating his senior thesis project, SHAPESHIFTER, via video link to a class in another room^{[L68]}

Lewis was born in Boston and grew up in Wellesley, Massachusetts. His parents were physicians – his father a hospital chief of anesthesiology and his mother the head of the Dever State School for intellectually disabled children. His father was a World War II veteran and the son of a German Lutheran father and a Russian Jewish mother. After graduating summa cum laude at the end of the eleventh grade at Boston's Roxbury Latin School he entered Harvard College, where he was for a time a third-string lacrosse goalie.

Lewis has said that he discovered "I wasn't a real mathematician [once] I got out of the amateur leagues of high school mathematics", but was "tremendously excited" by the computer-science research opportunities at Harvard.^{[L2]}As a senior he lectured a graduate class using a computer-graphics program, SHAPESHIFTER, which he had developed for displaying complex-plane transformations on a cathode ray tube. SHAPESHIFTER automatically recognized formulas and commands hand-entered via a stylus on a RAND tablet, and could be "trained" to recognize the handwriting of individual users. There being no degree program in computer science per se at Harvard at the time,^{[L2]} in 1968 Lewis received his BA (summa, Quincy House) in applied mathematics and was elected to Phi Beta Kappa.

After serving for two years in the United States Public Health Service Commissioned Corps as a commissioned officer in the role of mathematician and computer scientist for the National Institutes of Health in Bethesda, Maryland, he spent a year in Europe as a Frederick Sheldon Traveling Fellow. He then returned to Harvard, where he earned his M.A. in 1973 and PhD in 1974, after which he was immediately appointed assistant professor of computer science. He became an associate professor in 1978, and Gordon McKay Professor of Computer Science in 1981.

Lewis formally retired in 2020, (Note: https://cyber.harvard.edu/people/hlewis) but continues to teach as Gordon McKay Research Professor in Computer Science. (Note: https://seas.harvard.edu/person/harry-lewis) His wife Marlyn McGrath retired in 2021 after 42 years as Harvard College's director of admissions. (Note: https://www.harvardmagazine.com/2021/01/jhj-brevia-jf21) The Harry Lewis and Marlyn McGrath Professorship of Engineering and Applied Sciences was endowed by one of Lewis's former students in 2012. (Note: https://web.archive.org/web/20221207034234/https://seas.harvard.edu/person/robert-wood)

== Teaching ==
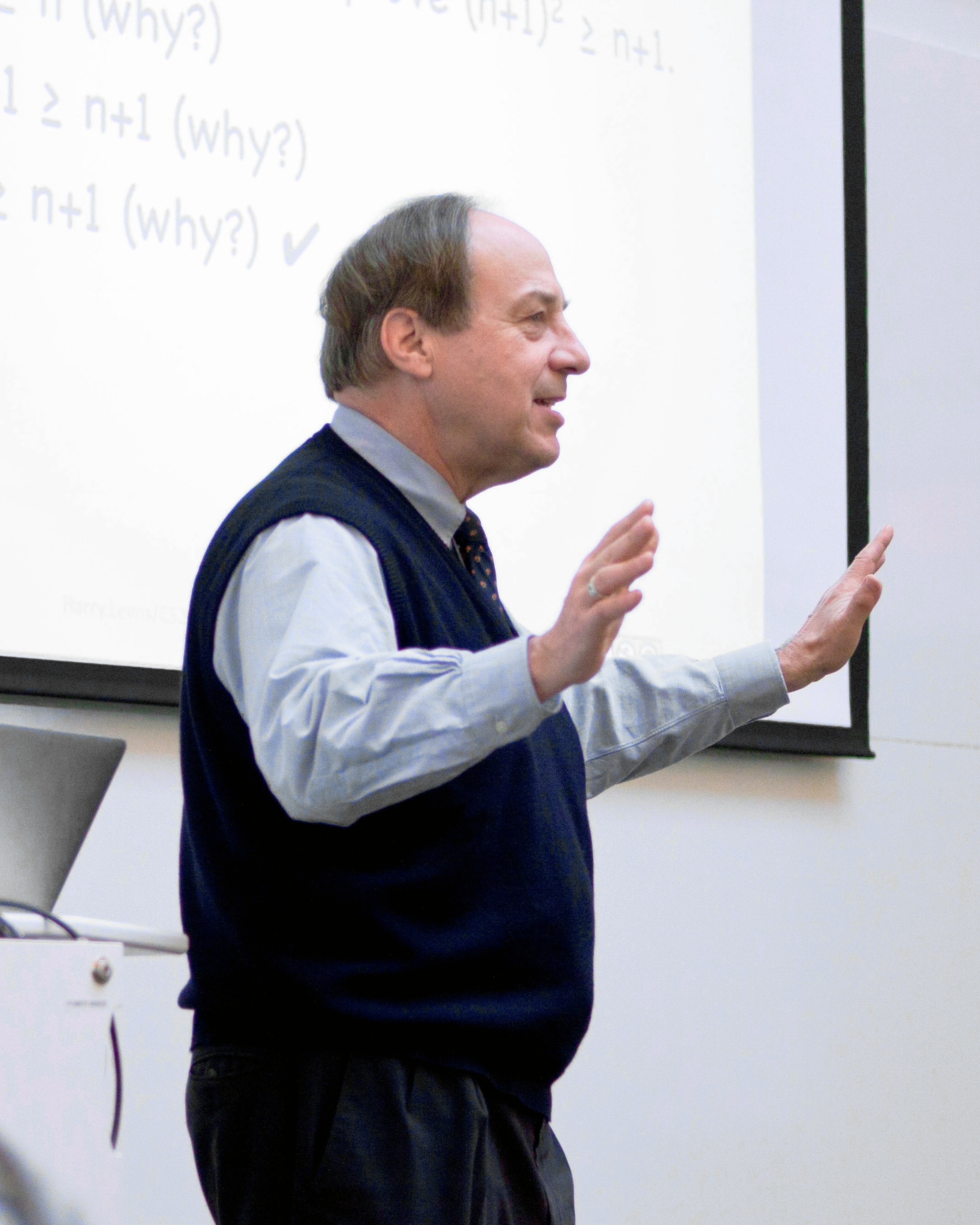
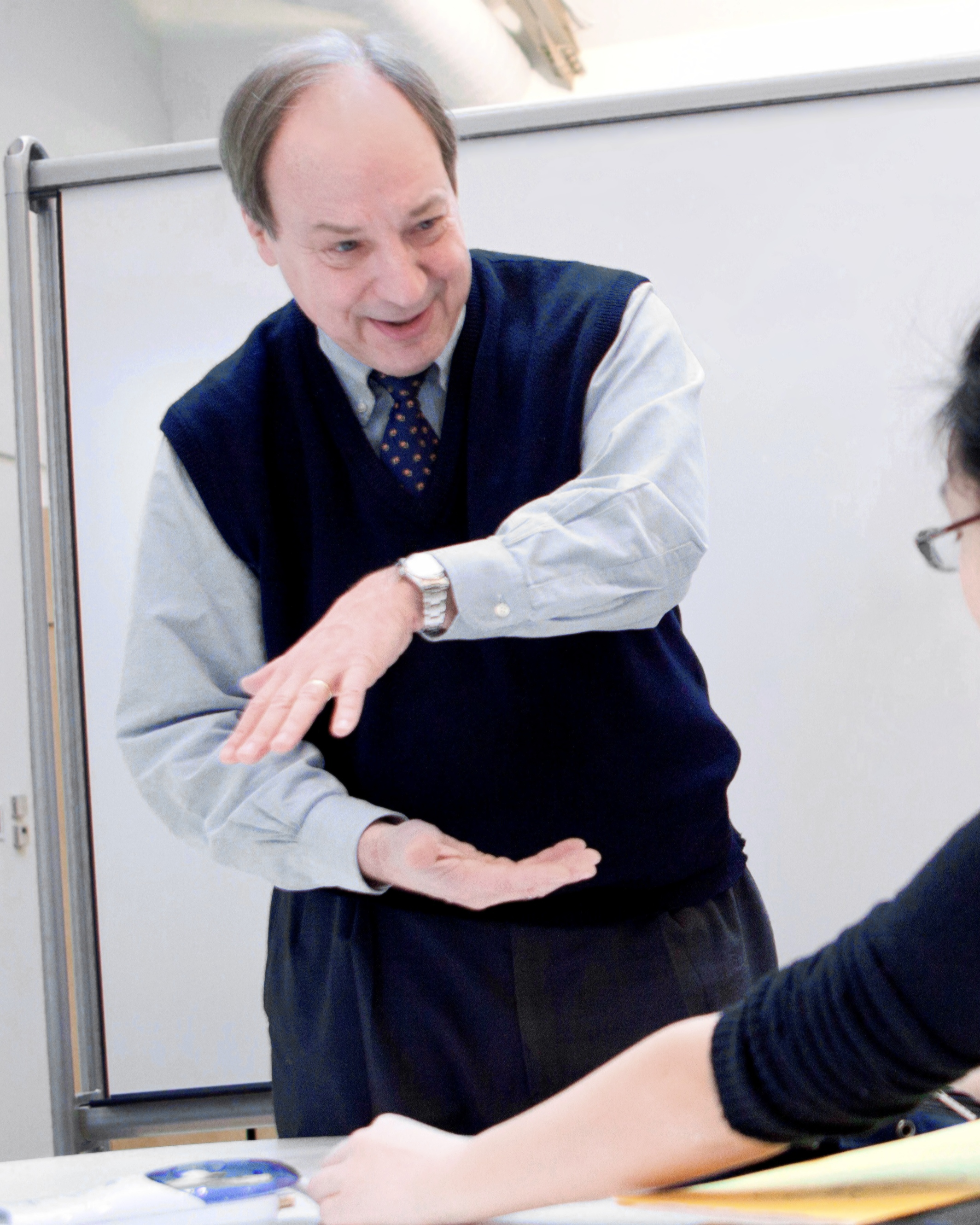
Teaching in 2012

Lewis has pointed out that – largely because his career began when the field of computer science "barely existed", and Harvard offered almost no computer science courses at the undergraduate level – he originated almost all the courses he has taught. It was his proposal, in the late 1970s, that Harvard create a major specifically for computer science (which until then had been a branch of Harvard's applied mathematics program).^{[L2]}

From 2003 to 2008 he was designated a Harvard College Professor in recognition of "particularly distinguished contributions to undergraduate teaching". In 2021 the IEEE Computer Society awarded him its annual Mary Kenneth Keller Computer Science & Engineering Undergraduate Teaching Award, citing "his over forty-year dedication towards undergraduate computer science education at Harvard, his authoring of Computer Science introductory textbooks, and his mentoring of many future educators."

Six of his teaching assistants are now members of the Harvard faculty and many others are professors of computer science (or related disciplines) elsewhere; many have gone on to win teaching awards themselves, including Eric Roberts (Association for Computing Machinery Karlstrom Award), Nicholas Horton (Robert V. Hogg Award), Joseph A. Konstan (University of Minnesota Distinguished University Teaching Professor, Graduate/Professional Teaching Award), and Margo Seltzer (Herchel Smith Professor of Computer Science at Harvard, Phi Beta Kappa teaching award, Abramson Teaching Award).

His undergraduate students have included Mark Zuckerberg (whose website "Six Degrees to Harry Lewis" was a precursor to Facebook – six degrees being a reference to the small world hypothesis), Microsoft founder Bill Gates (who solved an open theoretical problem Lewis had described in class), and nine future Harvard professors.

Lewis is the author or coauthor of five textbooks:

- An Introduction to Computer Programming and Data Structures using MACRO-11 (1981).^{[L81]} MACRO-11 was an assembly language for PDP-11 computers.
- Elements of the Theory of Computation (1981, with Christos H. Papadimitriou)^{[LP81]} covers automata theory, computational complexity theory, and the theory of formal languages; its inclusion of complexity theory and mathematical logic was innovative for its time. It has been called an "excellent traditional text" but one whose terse and heavily mathematical style can be intimidating. Although intended for undergraduates, it has also been used for introductory graduate courses.
- Data Structures and Their Algorithms (1991, with Larry Denenberg).^{[LD]}
- Essential Discrete Mathematics for Computer Science (2019, with Rachel Zax). (Note: https://press.princeton.edu/books/hardcover/9780691179292/essential-discrete-mathematics-for-computer-science)
- Ideas that Created the Future (2021), a collection of "forty-six classic papers in computer science that map the evolution of the field." (Note: https://mitpress.mit.edu/books/ideas-created-future)

Lewis has also taught a course on amateur athletics and the social history of sports in America.

== Dean of Harvard College ==
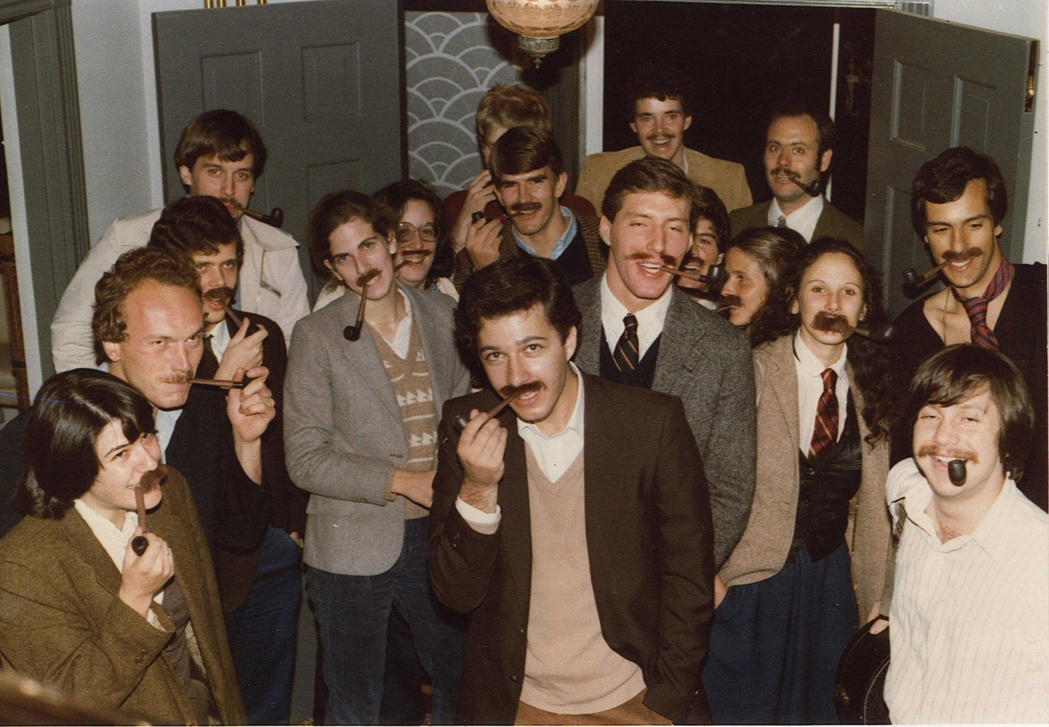
On Halloween 1982, Lewis' teaching assistants appeared at his home in "Harry Lewis" costume, including his then-trademark mustache and pipe. Future Harvard professor Margo Seltzer is at left.

In 1994 Lewis coauthored the "comprehensive" Report on the Structure of Harvard College, and in 1995 he was appointed dean of Harvard College, responsible for the nonacademic aspects of undergraduate life. In that capacity he oversaw a number of sometimes-controversial policy changes, including changes to the handling of allegations of sexual assault, reorganization of the college's public-service programs, a crackdown on underage alcohol consumption, and random assignment of students to upperclass houses (countering the social segregation found under the prior system of assignment according to student preference). (Note: See Harvard College § House system.) He also pressed improvements to advising and health care. A colleague has said that Lewis "reshaped undergraduate life more powerfully than anyone else in recent memory." Lewis continued to teach throughout his time as dean.

After the 2001 inauguration of Harvard University's twenty-seventh president, Lawrence Summers, Lewis and Summers came into conflict over the direction of Harvard College and its educational philosophy. Lewis, for example, emphasized the importance of extracurricular pursuits, advising incoming freshmen that "flexibility in your schedule, unstructured time in your day, and evenings spent with your friends rather than your books are all, in a larger sense, essential for your education", while Summers complained of an insufficiently intellectual "Camp Harvard" and admonished students that "You are here to work, and your business here is to learn."^{[L06]}^{[L1]} After Lewis issued what The Harvard Crimson called "a scathing indictment of the view that increasing intellectual rigor ought to be the [College's] priority" – pointing out that prospective employers show less interest in grades than in personal qualities built outside the classroom – he was peremptorily removed as dean in March 2003.

In 2015 Lewis served as interim Dean of the Harvard School of Engineering and Applied Sciences.

== Writings on education and technology ==
Lewis is a Faculty Associate of Harvard's Berkman Center for Internet & Society. In addition to his research publications and textbooks, he has written a number of works on higher education and the impact of computers on society.

Drawing heavily on his experience as dean of Harvard College, his Excellence Without A Soul: How a Great University Forgot Education (2006) critiques what he sees as the abandonment by American universities, including Harvard, of the

fundamental job of undergraduate education ... to turn eighteen- and nineteen-year-olds into twenty-one- and twenty-two-year-olds, to help them grow up, to learn who they are, to search for a larger purpose for their lives, and to leave college as better human beings.^{[L06]}

In "Renewing the Civic Mission of American Higher Education" (with Ellen Condliffe Lagemann, 2012) Lewis warns that "a flourishing multiplicity of worthy but uncoordinated agendas has crowded out higher education's commitment to the common good":

The ongoing erosion of civic concerns within American higher education is alarming and dangerous ... [Colleges] are a natural place for citizens to learn values beyond their own personal welfare, to see themselves as part of a society of mutual rights and responsibilities. They should be settings in which engagement with questions concerning justice and goodness is essential to daily routines ... Effective civic education must simultaneously involve students' capacities for thinking intellectually, for making moral judgments, and for [taking action in response to those judgments] ... Free societies will not thrive unless colleges, graduate schools, and professional schools understand that the civic health of the nation is one of their central responsibilities.^{[LL]}

Developed from a course taught by its authors, Blown to Bits: Your Life, Liberty, and Happiness After the Digital Explosion (2008, with Hal Abelson and Ken Ledeen) explores the origins and consequences of the 21st-century explosion in digital information, including its impact on culture and privacy:

It is now possible, in principle, to remember everything that anyone says, writes, sings, draws, or photographs. Everything ... Global computer networks can make it available to everywhere in the world, almost instantly. And computers are powerful enough to extract meaning from all that information, to find patterns and make connections in the blink of an eye.

In centuries gone by, others may have dreamed these things could happen, in utopian fantasies or in nightmares. But now they are happening.^{[ALL]}

Baseball as a Second Language: Explaining the Game Americans Use to Explain Everything Else (self-published as an experiment in open access in 2011) discusses the many ways baseball concepts and imagery have made their way into American English. It was inspired by Lewis' experiences explaining baseball to international students.

== Research ==
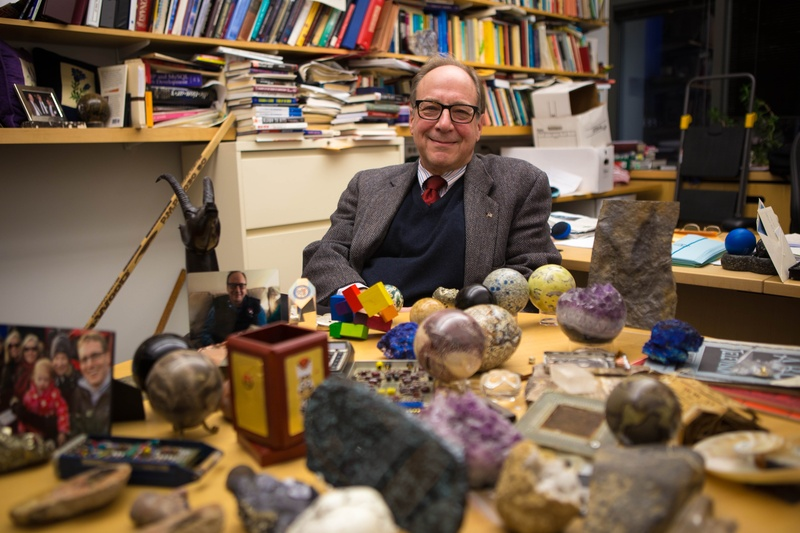
Lewis in his office (2016)

Lewis' undergraduate thesis describing SHAPESHIFTER, "Two applications of hand-printed two-dimensional computer input",^{[L68]} was written under computer graphics pioneer Ivan Sutherland and presented at the 23rd National Conference of the Association for Computing Machinery in 1968. It was followed by several papers on related topics.

Much of Lewis' subsequent research concerned the computational complexity of problems in mathematical logic. His doctoral thesis, "Herbrand Expansions and Reductions of the Decision Problem", was supervised by Burton Dreben and dealt with Herbrand's theorem. His 1979 book, Unsolvable classes of quantificational formulas^{[L79]} complemented The Decision Problem: Solvable classes of quantificational formula by Dreben and Warren Goldfarb.

His 1978 paper "Renaming a set of clauses as a Horn set" addressed the Boolean satisfiability problem, of determining whether a logic formula in conjunctive normal form can be made true by a suitable assignment of its variables. In general, these problems are hard, but there are two major subclasses of satisfiability for which polynomial time solutions are known: 2-satisfiability (where each clause of the formula has two literals) and Horn-satisfiability (where each clause has at most one positive literal). Lewis expanded the second of these subclasses, by showing that the problem can still be solved in polynomial time when the input is not already in Horn form, but can be put into Horn form by replacing some variables by their negations. The problem of choosing which variables to negate to make each clause get two positive literals, making the re-signed instance into a Horn set, turns out to be expressible as an instance of 2-satisfiability, the other solvable case of the satisfiability problem. By solving a 2-satisfiability instance to turn the given input into a Horn set, Lewis shows that the instances that can be turned into Horn sets can also be solved in polynomial time.^{[L78]} The time for the sign reassignment in the original version of what Lindhorst and Shahrokhi called "this elegant result" was O (mn^{2}) for an instance with m clauses and n variables, but it can be reduced to linear time by breaking long input clauses into smaller clauses and applying a faster 2-satisfiability algorithm.

Lewis' paper "Complexity results for classes of quantificational formulas" (1980) deals with the computational complexity of problems in first-order logic. Such problems are undecidable in general, but there are several special classes of these problems, defined by restricting the order in which their quantifiers appear, that were known to be decidable. One of these special classes, for instance, is the Bernays–Schönfinkel class. For each of these special classes, Lewis establishes tight exponential time bounds either for deterministic or nondeterministic time complexity. For instance, he shows that the Bernays–Schönfinkel class is NEXPTIME-complete, and more specifically that its nondeterministic time complexity is both upper- and lower-bounded by a singly exponential function of the input length.^{[L80]} Börger, Grädel, and Gurevich write that "this paper initiated the study of the complexity of decidable classes of the decision problem".

"A logic of concrete time intervals" (1990) concerned temporal logic.^{[L90]} This paper accompanied an earlier Aiken Computation Laboratory technical report, "Finite-state analysis of asynchronous circuits with bounded temporal uncertainty", where he first proposed the representation of an asynchronous circuit, with bounded temporal uncertainty on gate transition events, as a finite-state machine. This paper was the earliest work on the verification of timing properties that modeled time both asynchronously and continuously, neither discretizing time nor imposing a global clock.

Some of Lewis' other heavily cited research papers extend beyond logic. His paper "Symbolic evaluation and the global value graph" (1977, with his student John Reif) concerned data-flow analysis and symbolic execution in compilers.^{[RL]} And his paper "Symmetric space-bounded computation" (1982, with Christos Papadimitriou)^{[LP82]} was the first to define symmetric Turing machines and symmetric space complexity classes such as SL (an undirected or reversible analogue of nondeterministic space complexity, later shown to coincide with deterministic logarithmic space). In 1982, he chaired the program committee for the Symposium on Theory of Computing,^{[STOC]} one of the two top research conferences in theoretical computer science, considered broadly.

== Personal life ==
While a student at Harvard, Lewis met Marlyn McGrath, who was a year younger than Lewis (though two grades his junior, as Lewis was a year ahead). The two married in June 1968, two days after Lewis graduated from Harvard. The couple have two daughters, Elizabeth and Annie. Elizabeth later married The New York Times journalist David Fahrenthold, who covered Lewis for The Harvard Crimson as an undergraduate before he met Elizabeth. While still a Harvard undergraduate, Fahrenthold wrote of his future father-in-law:

I've heard that if you sit out by the river [i.e. the Charles River] long enough, Dean of the College Harry R. Lewis '68 comes along and hands out computer science problem sets so you'll get back to work.

Lewis is a Visitor of Ralston College and a Life Trustee of the Roxbury Latin School. From 1995 to 2003 he was Trustee of the Charity of Edward Hopkins.

== Selected publications ==
=== Computer science research ===
L68.	Lewis, Harry R. (1968). Two applications of hand-printed two-dimensional computer input (Thesis). Harvard University.

RL.	Reif, John H.; Lewis, Harry R. (1977). "Symbolic evaluation and the global value graph". Proceedings of the 4th ACM SIGACT-SIGPLAN Symposium on Principles of Programming Languages (POPL '77). New York: ACM. pp. 104–118. doi:10.1145/512950.512961.

L78.	Lewis, Harry R. (1978). "Renaming a set of clauses as a Horn set". Journal of the ACM. 25 (1): 134–135. doi:10.1145/322047.322059. MR 0468315. S2CID 3071958.

L79.	—— (1979). Unsolvable classes of quantificational formulas. Addison-Wesley. ISBN 978-0-201-04069-2.

- Börger, Egon (1981). Review of Unsolvable classes of quantificational formulas. MR 0544668.
- Gurevich, Yuri (1982). "Book Review: The decision problem: Solvable classes of quantificational formulas. Book Review: Unsolvable classes of quantificational formulas". Bulletin of the American Mathematical Society. New Series. 7 (1): 273–277. doi:10.1090/S0273-0979-1982-15033-9. MR 1567367.

L80.	—— (1980). "Complexity results for classes of quantificational formulas". Journal of Computer and System Sciences. 21 (3): 317–353. doi:10.1016/0022-0000(80)90027-6. MR 0603587. A preliminary version, "Complexity of solvable cases of the decision problem for the predicate calculus", was presented at the Symposium on Foundations of Computer Science, 1978.

LP82.	——; Papadimitriou, Christos H. (1982). "Symmetric space-bounded computation". Theoretical Computer Science. 19 (2): 161–187. doi:10.1016/0304-3975(82)90058-5. MR 0666539. A preliminary version was presented at the International Colloquium on Automata, Languages and Programming, 1980.

STOC.	——, ed. (1982). Proceedings of the Fourteenth Annual ACM Symposium on Theory of Computing. Association for Computing Machinery.

L90.	—— (1990). "A logic of concrete time intervals (extended abstract)". Fifth Annual IEEE Symposium on Logic in Computer Science (Philadelphia, PA, 1990). Los Alamitos: IEEE Computer Society Press. pp. 380–389. doi:10.1109/LICS.1990.113763. MR 1099190.

=== Computers and society ===
ALL.	——; Abelson, Hal; Ledeen, Ken (2008). Blown to Bits: Your Life, Liberty, and Happiness After the Digital Explosion. Addison-Wesley. Also translated into Chinese and Russian.

- Gasarch, William (2009). "Review of Blown to Bits" (PDF). The Book Review Column. ACM SIGACT News. 40 (1): 10–13. doi:10.1145/1515698.1515701. S2CID 8505768.
- Tanaka Okopnik, Kat (August 31, 2008). "Book Review: Blown to Bits". Linux Gazette. No. 154.
- "Off the Shelf: Recent books with Harvard connections". Harvard Magazine. July–August 2008.
- Interview with authors, Stanford Center for Internet and Society

L09.	—— (2009). "Digital Books". International Journal of the Humanities. 7 (8): 59–66.

L11a.	—— (2011). Shephard, Jennifer M.; Kosslyn, Stephen Michael; Hammonds, Evelynn Maxine (eds.). "The Internet and Hieronymus Bosch: Fear, Protection, and Liberty in Cyberspace". The Harvard Sampler: Liberal Education for the Twenty-First Century. Harvard University Press. pp. 57–90. ISBN 978-0-674-05902-3.

=== Textbooks ===
L81.	—— (1981). An Introduction to Computer Programming and Data Structures using MACRO-11. Reston Publishing Company.

LP81.	——; Papadimitriou, Christos H. (1981). Elements of the Theory of Computation. Prentice-Hall. 2nd ed., 1997. Various translations.

- Gallier, Jean H. (September 1984). "Review: Elements of the Theory of Computation by Harry R. Lewis; Christos H. Papadimitriou". Journal of Symbolic Logic. 49 (3): 989–990. doi:10.2307/2274157. JSTOR 2274157. S2CID 118180594.
- Greenleaf, Newcomb (1992). "Bringing mathematics education into the algorithmic age". In Myers, J. Paul Jr.; O'Donnell, Michael J. (eds.). Constructivity in Computer Science: Summer Symposium San Antonio, TX, June 19–22, 1991, Proceedings. Lecture Notes in Computer Science. Vol. 613. Springer. pp. 199–217. doi:10.1007/bfb0021092. ISBN 978-3-540-55631-2. See in particular p. 205.

LD.	——; Denenberg, Larry (1991). Data Structures and Their Algorithms. HarperCollins.

=== Higher education ===
L1.	——. "Slow Down: Getting More out of Harvard by Doing Less" (PDF). (Advice to incoming Harvard College students.)

L2.	——. Jacobson, Matthew (ed.). "Harry Lewis, professor of computer science and former dean of college, Harvard University". The Education Project.

L06.	—— (2006). Excellence Without a Soul: How a Great University Forgot Education. PublicAffairs. Trans. Chinese, Korean.

- Sleeper, Jim (May 28, 2006). "Examining the Crimson's civic slide". Boston Globe.
- Shea, Christopher (July 2, 2006). "Poison Ivy: A Harvard man urges the school to redefine its mission". Washington Post.
- Gasarch, William (2007). "Review of Excellence Without a Soul" (PDF). The Book Review Column. ACM SIGACT News. 38 (1): 9–13. doi:10.1145/1233481.1233486. S2CID 7768602.

LL.	——; Lagemann, Ellen Condliffe (2011). Lewis, Harry R.; Ellen Condliffe, Lagemann (eds.). "Renewing the Civic Mission of American Higher Education". What is College For? The Public Purpose of Higher Education. Teachers College Press.

- Ream, Todd C. (Spring 2013). "What Is College For? The Public Purpose of Higher Education". The Review of Higher Education. 36 (3): 427–429. doi:10.1353/rhe.2013.0035. S2CID 143896301.
- Cecil, Kyle (2014). "What Is College For? The Public Purpose of Higher Education". Journal of Higher Education Outreach and Engagement. 18 (2): 307–312.
- Bettencourt, Genia M.; Kimball, Ezekial (2015). "Book Review: What is College For? The Public Purpose of Higher Education". Journal of Student Affairs Research and Practice. 52 (2): 234–236. doi:10.1080/19496591.2015.1018271. S2CID 155677946.
- Rawls, Kristin (October 12, 2012). "10. 'What Is College For? The Public Purpose of Higher Education,' edited by Ellen Condliffe Lagemann and Harry Lewis". 10 must-read books about higher education in America. Christian Science Monitor.

L11b.	—— (2011). Education, Books, & Society in the Information Age: The Hong Kong Lectures. Chameleon Press.

=== Other ===
L11c.	—— (2011). Baseball as a Second Language: Explaining the Game Americans Use to Explain Everything Else. Self-published.
