= Comprehensive School Mathematics Program =

Comprehensive School Mathematics Program (CSMP) stands for both the name of a curriculum and the name of the project that was responsible for developing curriculum materials in the United States.

Two major curricula were developed as part of the overall CSMP project: the Comprehensive School Mathematics Program (CSMP), a K–6 mathematics program for regular classroom instruction, and the Elements of Mathematics (EM) program, a grades 7–12 mathematics program for gifted students. EM treats traditional topics rigorously and in-depth, and was the only curriculum that strictly adhered to Goals for School Mathematics: The Report of the Cambridge Conference on School Mathematics (1963). As a result, it includes much of the content generally required for an undergraduate mathematics major. These two curricula are unrelated to one another, but certain members of the CSMP staff contributed to the development of both projects. Additionally, some staff of the Elements of Mathematics were also involved with the Secondary School Mathematics Curriculum Improvement Study program being. What follows is a description of the K–6 program that was designed for a general, heterogeneous audience.

The CSMP project was established in 1966, under the direction of Burt Kaufman, who remained director until 1979, succeeded by Clare Heidema. It was originally affiliated with Southern Illinois University in Carbondale, Illinois. After a year of planning, CSMP was incorporated into the Central Midwest Regional Educational Laboratory (later CEMREL, Inc.), one of the national educational laboratories funded at that time by the U.S. Office of Education. In 1984, the project moved to Mid-continental Research for Learning (McREL) Institute's Comprehensive School Reform program, who supported the program until 2003. Heidema remained director to its conclusion. In 1984, it was implemented in 150 school districts in 42 states and about 55,000 students.

== Overview ==
The CSMP project employs four non-verbal languages for the purpose of posing problems and representing mathematical concepts: the Papy Minicomputer (mental computation), Arrows (relations), Strings (classification), and Calculators (patterns). It was designed to teach mathematics as a problem-solving activity rather than simply teaching arithmetic skills, and uses the Socratic method, guiding students to figure out concepts on their own rather than directly lecturing or demonstrating the material. The curriculum uses a spiral structure and philosophy, providing students chances to learn materials at different times and rates. By giving students repeated exposure to a variety of content – even if all students may not initially fully understand – students may experience, assimilate, apply, and react to a variety of mathematical experiences, learning to master different concepts over time, at their own paces, rather than being presented with a single topic to study until mastered.

The curriculum introduced many basic concepts such as fractions and integers earlier than normal. Later in the project's development, new content in probability and geometry was introduced. The curriculum contained a range of supporting material including story books with mathematical problems, with lessons often posed in a story, designed to feature both real world and fantasy situations. One character in these books was Eli the Elephant, a pachyderm with a bag of magic peanuts, some representing positive integers and some negative. Another lesson was titled "Nora's Neighborhood," which taught taxicab geometry.

== Minicomputer ==
The number 9067 represented on a Minicomputer.

One device used throughout the program was the Papy Minicomputer, named after Frédérique Papy-Lenger – the most influential figure to the project – and her husband Georges Papy. A Minicomputer is a 2 by 2 grid of squares, with the quarters representing the numbers 1, 2, 4, and 8. Checkers can be placed on the grid to represent different numbers in a similar fashion to the way the binary numeral system is used to represent numbers in a computer.

The Minicomputer is laid out as follows: a white square in the lower right corner with a value of 1, a red square in the lower-left with a value of 2, a purple square in the upper right with a value of 4, and a brown square in the upper left with a value of 8. Each Minicomputer is designed to represent a single decimal digit, and multiple Minicomputers can be used together to represent multiple-digit numbers. Each successive board's values are increased by a power of ten. For example, a second Minicomputer's squares – placed to the left of the first – will represent 10, 20, 40, and 80; a third, 100, 200, 400, and 800, and so on. Minicomputers to the right of a vertical bar (placed to the right of the first board, representing a decimal point) may be used to represent decimal numbers.

Students are instructed to represent values on the Minicomputers by adding checkers to the proper squares. To do this only requires a memorization of representations for the digits zero through nine, although non-standard representations are possible since squares can hold more than one checker. Each checker is worth the value of the square it is in, and the sum of the checkers on the board(s) determine the overall value represented. Most checkers used by students are a solid color – any color is fine. The only exception is checkers marked with a caret (^), which are negative.

An example of representing a number: 9067 requires four boards. The leftmost board has two checkers in the 8 and 1 squares (8000 + 1000). The second board has none, as the value has zero hundreds. The third board has checkers in the 4 and 2 squares (40 + 20), and the rightmost board has checkers in the 4, 2, and 1 squares (4 + 2 + 1). Together, these 7 values (8000 + 1000 + 40 + 20 + 4 + 2 + 1) total up to 9067. This would be considered a standard way to represent the number as it involves the fewest checkers possible without involving negatives. It would require fewer checkers to replace the last board with a positive checker in the 8 and a negative checker in the 1, but this is not taught as the standard.

Arithmetic can be performed on the Minicomputer by combining two numbers' representations into a single board and performing simplification techniques. One such technique is to replace checkers from the 8 and 2 squares of one board with a checker on the 1 square of the adjacent board to the left. Another technique is to replace a pair of checkers in the same square with one checker in the next higher square, such as two 4s with an 8.

== Study results ==
The program received extensive evaluation, with over 50 studies. These studies showed broadly similar results for non CSMP students in computation, concepts and applications; however, there was a marked improvement when students were assessed according to The Mathematics Applied to Novel Situations (MANS) tests, introduced to measure students' ability to problem solve in novel situations.

== Copyright ==
Copyright is currently held by McREL International.

== Current curriculum use ==
Burt Kaufman, a mathematics curriculum specialist, headed the team at Southern Illinois University writing CSMP. In July 1993, he started the Institute for Mathematics and Computer Science (IMACS) with his son and two colleagues. IMACS uses elements of the EM and CSMP programs in their "Mathematics Enrichment" program. For instance, Minicomputers and "Eli the Elephant" are present in the IMACS material. IMACS is a private education business focusing on the instruction of students from first grade through high school. Including online courses, IMACS currently serves over 4,000 students across the U.S. and in over ten countries.

CSMP is also used by some homeschooling families either as a core math program or for enrichment exercises.
