= Googolplex =

Number ten to the power of a googol

A googolplex is the large number 10^{10^{100}}, that is, 10 raised to the power of a googol. If written out in ordinary decimal notation, it would be 1 followed by a googol (10^{100}) zeroes—‌a physically impossible number to write explicitly.

== History ==
In 1920, Edward Kasner's nine-year-old nephew, Milton Sirotta, coined the term googol, which is 10^{100}, and then proposed the further term googolplex to be "one, followed by writing zeroes until you get tired". Kasner decided to adopt a more formal definition because "different people get tired at different times and it would never do to have Carnera [be] a better mathematician than Dr. Einstein, simply because he had more endurance and could write for longer". It thus became standardized to 10^{(10^{100})}, which is usually written as 10^{10^{100}} using the conventional interpretation for serial exponentiation.

== Size ==
A typical book can be printed with one million zeros (around 400 pages with 50 lines per page and 50 zeros per line). Therefore, it requires 10^{94} such books to print all the zeros of a googolplex (that is, printing a googol zeros). If each book had a mass of 100 grams, all of them would have a total mass of 10^{93} kilograms. In comparison, Earth's mass is 5.97×10^{24} kilograms, the mass of the Milky Way galaxy is estimated at 1.8×10^{42} kilograms, and the total mass of all the stars in the observable universe is estimated at 2×10^{52} kg.

Thus, the mass of all such books required to write out a googolplex would be vastly greater than the mass of the observable universe by a factor of roughly 5×10^{40}.

=== In the physical universe ===
In the PBS science program Cosmos: A Personal Voyage, Episode 9: "The Lives of the Stars", astronomer and television personality Carl Sagan estimated that writing a googolplex in full decimal form (i.e., "10,000,000,000...") would be physically impossible, since doing so would require more space than is available in the known universe. Sagan gave an example that if the entire volume of the observable universe is filled with fine dust particles roughly 1.5 micrometers in size (0.0015 millimeters), then the number of different combinations in which the particles could be arranged and numbered would be about one googolplex.

10^{97} is a high estimate of the elementary particles existing in the visible universe (not including dark matter), mostly photons and other massless force carriers.

== Mod n ==
The residues (mod n) of a googolplex, starting with mod 1, are:

0, 0, 1, 0, 0, 4, 4, 0, 1, 0, 1, 4, 3, 4, 10, 0, 1, 10, 9, 0, 4, 12, 13, 16, 0, 16, 10, 4, 24, 10, 5, 0, 1, 18, 25, 28, 10, 28, 16, 0, 1, 4, 24, 12, 10, 36, 9, 16, 4, 0, ... (sequence A067007 in the OEIS)

This sequence is the same as the sequence of residues (mod n) of a googol up until the 17th position.

== See also ==
- Graham's number
- Names of large numbers
- Orders of magnitude (numbers)
- Skewes's number
- Infinity
