= What Is Mathematics? =

1941 book

- Cover of the second edition (1996)
- Author: Richard Courant; Herbert Robbins
- Language: English
- Subject: Mathematics
- Genre: Non-fiction
- Publisher: Oxford University Press
- Publication date: 1941
- Media type: Print (paperback)
- Pages: 521
- ISBN: 0-19-502517-2
- OCLC: 16608993

What Is Mathematics? is a classic book by Richard Courant and Herbert Robbins, published by Oxford University Press. Written in the belief that "the traditional place of mathematics in education is in grave danger," it is an introduction to mathematics, intended to offer "vantage points from which the substance and driving forces of modern mathematics can be surveyed" both by students and by the general public.

First published in 1941, it discusses number theory, geometry, topology, and calculus. A posthumous edition was published in 1996 with an additional chapter on recent progress in mathematics, including the proofs of the four-color map theorem and Fermat's last theorem, written by Ian Stewart.

== Authorship ==
The book was based on Courant's course material. Although Robbins assisted in writing a large part of the book, he had to fight for authorship. Courant alone held the copyright for the book. This resulted in Robbins receiving a smaller share of the royalties.

According to Constance Reid, Courant finalized the choice of the title after discussing it with Thomas Mann.

== Translations ==
- The first Russian translation Что такое математика? was published in 1947; there were 5 translations since then, the last one in 2010.
- The first Italian translation, Che cos'è la matematica?, was published in 1950. А translation of the second edition was issued in 2000.
- The first German translation Was ist Mathematik? by Iris Runge was published in 1962.
- A Spanish translation of the second edition, ¿Qué Son Las Matemáticas?, was published in 2002.
- The first Bulgarian translation, Що е математика?, was published in 1967. А second translation appeared in 1985.
- The first Romanian translation, Ce este matematica?, was published in 1969.
- The first Polish translation, Co to jest matematyka, was published in 1959. А second translation appeared in 1967. А translation of the second edition was published in 1998.
- The first Hungarian translation, Mi a matematika?, was published in 1966.
- The first Serbian translation, Šta je matematika?, was published in 197

Ş

- The first Japanese translation, 数学とは何か, was published in 1966. А translation of the second edition was published in 2001.
- A Korean translation of the second edition, 수학이란 무엇인가, was published in 2000.
- A Portuguese translation of the second edition, O que é matemática?, was published in 2000.

== Reviews ==
- What is Mathematics? An Elementary Approach to Ideas and Methods, book review by Brian E. Blank, Notices of the American Mathematical Society 48, #11 (December 2001), pp. 1325–1330
- What is Mathematics?, book review by Leonard Gillman, The American Mathematical Monthly 105, #5 (May 1998), pp. 485–488.

== Editions ==
- Richard Courant and Herbert Robbins (1941). What is Mathematics?: An Elementary Approach to Ideas and Methods. London: Oxford University Press. Reprinted several times with a few corrections of minor errors and misprints as a "Second Edition" in 1943, a "Third Edition" in 1945, a "Fourth Edition" in 1947", a "Ninth Printing" in 1958 and a "Tenth Printing" in 1960, and another edition in 1978.
- (1996) 2nd edition, with additional material by Ian Stewart. New York: Oxford University Press. ISBN 0-19-510519-2.
- Courant, Richard; Robbins, Herbert (2015). Qu'est-ce que les mathématiques ? Une introduction élémentaire aux idées et aux méthodes. Cassini. ISBN 9782842252045. French translation of the second English edition by Marie Anglade and Karine Py.
- Courant, Richard; Robbins, Herbert; Stewart, Ian (2002). ¿Qué Son Las Matemáticas? Conceptos y métodos fundamentales (in Spanish). México, D. F.: Fondo de Cultura Económica. ISBN 968-16-6717-4. Spanish translation of the second English edition.
- Courant, Richard; Robbins, Herbert (1950). Che cos'è la matematica? Introduzione elementare ai suoi concetti e metodi (in Italian). Turin: Einaudi. (first Italian translation, from the 1945 English edition)
- Courant, Richard; Robbins, Herbert (1971). Che cos'è la matematica? Introduzione elementare ai suoi concetti e metodi (in Italian). Turin: Boringhieri. (based on the previous Einaudi's edition)
- Courant, Richard; Robbins, Herbert (1984). Toán học là gì (in Vietnamese). Hanoi: Khoa học Kỹ thuật. (Vietnamese translation by Hàn Liên Hải from the Russian edition)
- Courant, Richard; Robbins, Herbert; Stewart, Ian (2000). Che cos'è la matematica? Introduzione elementare ai suoi concetti e metodi (in Italian). Turin: Bollati Boringhieri. ISBN 88-339-1200-0. (Italian translation of the second English edition)
