= List of mathematics books =

This is a list of mathematics books including textbooks, expository works, popular mathematics fields, and historically significant treatises.

== General works ==
- Concrete Mathematics — Ronald Graham, Donald Knuth, and Oren Patashnik
- Concepts of Modern Mathematics — Ian Stewart
- Mathematics and the Imagination — Edward Kasner and James Newman
- Mathematics and Plausible Reasoning — George Pólya
- Mathematics: The Loss of Certainty — Morris Kline
- The Princeton Companion to Mathematics — Timothy Gowers
- What Is Mathematics? — Richard Courant and Herbert Robbins

== Popular mathematics and biographies ==
- A Mathematician's Apology — G. H. Hardy
- The Annotated Turing — Charles Petzold
- The Beauty of Fractals — Heinz-Otto Peitgen and Peter Richter
- The Emperor's New Mind — Roger Penrose
- Fermat's Enigma — Simon Singh
- God Created the Integers — Stephen Hawking
- Gödel, Escher, Bach — Douglas Hofstadter
- How Not to Be Wrong — Jordan Ellenberg
- The Man Who Loved Only Numbers — Paul Hoffman
- Prime Obsession — John Derbyshire
- Where Mathematics Comes From — George Lakoff and Rafael E. Núñez

== Algebra ==
- Algebra — Serge Lang
- Algebra: Chapter 0 — Paolo Aluffi

== Calculus and analysis ==
- Calculus on Manifolds — Michael Spivak
- Principles of Mathematical Analysis — Walter Rudin
- Introduction to Analysis — Maxwell Rosenlicht

== Geometry and topology ==
- Flatland — Edwin Abbott Abbott
- Indra's Pearls — David Mumford, Caroline Series, and David Wright
- Regular Polytopes — H. S. M. Coxeter
- Tilings and patterns — Branko Grünbaum and G. C. Shephard
- Topology — James R. Munkres

== Number theory ==
- An Introduction to the Theory of Numbers — G. H. Hardy and E. M. Wright
- A Course in Arithmetic — Jean-Pierre Serre
- A Classical Introduction to Modern Number Theory — Michael Rosen

== Probability and statistics ==
- An Introduction to Probability Theory and Its Applications — William Feller
- The Art of Statistics — David Spiegelhalter
- Introduction to Probability Models — Sheldon M. Ross

== Logic and foundations ==
- Proofs and Refutations — Imre Lakatos
- The Principles of Mathematics — Bertrand Russell
- On Formally Undecidable Propositions of Principia Mathematica and Related Systems — Kurt Gödel

== Algorithms ==
- Algorithms + Data Structures = Programs — Niklaus Wirth
- Algorithms Unlocked — Thomas H. Cormen
- The Art of Computer Programming — Donald Knuth
- Calendrical Calculations — Nachum Dershowitz and Edward Reingold
- Fundamentals of Computer Algorithms — Ellis Horowitz
- Hacker's Delight — Henry S. Warren, Jr.
- Introduction to Algorithms — Thomas H. Cormen, Charles E. Leiserson, Ronald Rivest, and Clifford Stein
- Jewels of Stringology — Maxime Crochemore and Wojciech Rytter
- The Master Algorithm: How the Quest for the Ultimate Learning Machine Will Remake Our World — Pedro Domingos
- Numerical Recipes — William H. Press, Saul A. Teukolsky, and Brian P. Flannery
- The Preparation of Programs for an Electronic Digital Computer — Maurice Wilkes, David Wheeler, and Stanley Gill

== Philosophy and foundations of mathematics ==
- Philosophy of Mathematics: Selected Readings — Paul Benacerraf and Hilary Putnam
- Philosophy of Mathematics and Natural Science — Hermann Weyl
- What Is Mathematics, Really? — Reuben Hersh

== Treatises ==
- Arithmetica — Diophantus
- Disquisitiones Arithmeticae — Carl Friedrich Gauss
- Introductio in analysin infinitorum — Leonhard Euler
- Mécanique analytique — Joseph-Louis Lagrange
- Principia Mathematica — Alfred North Whitehead and Bertrand Russell
- The Sand Reckoner — Archimedes
- Théorie analytique de la chaleur — Joseph Fourier
- The Elements — Euclid

== See also ==
- Comparison of TeX editors and list of TeX extensions
- Computational mathematics
- Computer-based mathematics education
- List of mathematical software and list of open-source software for mathematics
- List of mathematics topics
- List of programming books
- List of scientific publications by Albert Einstein
- List of unsolved problems in mathematics
- Lists of books
- Lists of mathematicians
- MathOverflow
- Outline of mathematics
- Philosophy of mathematics
- Terence Tao publications
- The Math(s) Fix – by Conrad Wolfram
