= Measure problem =

Measure problem may refer to:

- Measure problem (cosmology), problem concerning how to compute fractions of universes of different types within a multiverse
- A problem in measure theory–see Solovay model
- Klee's measure problem, problem of determining how efficiently the measure of a union of rectangular ranges can be computed
- McNamara fallacy, a bias disregarding what cannot be easily measured

== See also ==
- Measurement problem in quantum mechanics
