= Vinga =

Vinga could refer to:

- Vinga, Arad, a commune in Arad County, Romania
- Vinga (Gothenburg), an island near Gothenburg, Sweden

- Vinga Lighthouse, a lighthouse on the island

- Susana Vinga, academic at the University of Lisbon
