= Marie-France Sagot =

French Director of Research at INRIA

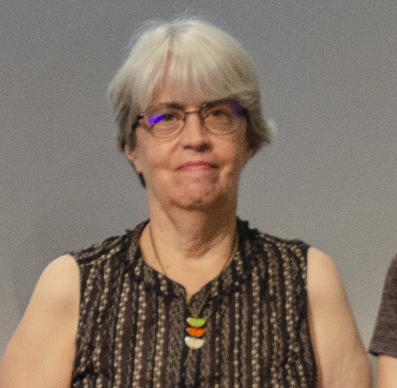
- Sagot receiving her International Society for Computational Biology fellowship
- Education: University of São Paulo (BSc); Paris Diderot University (MAS); University of Paris-Est Marne-la-Vallée (PhD)
- Awards: ISCB Fellow (2019)
- Scientific career
- Fields: Algorithms; Computational biology
- Workplaces: French Institute for Research in Computer Science and Automation (INRIA); Claude Bernard University Lyon 1 King's College London
- Thesis: Ressemblance lexicale et structurale entre macromolécules : formalisation et approches combinatoires (1996)
- Doctoral advisor: Maxime Crochemore and Alain Viari
- Website: team.inria.fr/erable/en/marie-france-sagot/

Marie-France Sagot is a researcher at the French Institute for Research in Computer Science and Automation (INRIA) and responsible for the INRIA European team ERABLE. She is also a member of staff at Claude Bernard University Lyon 1.

== Career ==
She earned her PhD and an Habilitation in computer science from the University of Marne-la-Vallée in France (1996), supervised by Maxime Crochemore. Sagot has recognized work on algorithms for computational biology and gene prediction and biological sequence analysis. She has coordinated more than 4 national and 20 international projects since 1998, including the INRIA Associated Team Compasso and the OLISSIPO project with Susana Vinga from INESC-ID/IST in Lisbon, Portugal. She has been involved in teaching and teaching organisations, including creating and directing the PhD Program on Computational Biology at the Instituto Gulbenkian de Ciência, Lisbon, Portugal, from 2004 to 2007.

She was elected a Fellow of the International Society for Computational Biology (ISCB) in 2019 for "outstanding contributions to the fields of computational biology and bioinformatics". Since 2002 she has been a visiting research fellow at King's College London. Her main research interests concern computational biology, algorithm analysis and design, and combinatorics.
