= James B. Saxe =

American computer scientist

James Benjamin Saxe is an American computer scientist who has worked for many years at the DEC Systems Research Center and its successors, the Compaq Systems Research Center and the Systems Research Center of HP Labs.

Saxe is known for his highly-cited publications on automated theorem proving,^{[DNS]} circuit complexity,^{[FSS]} retiming in synchronous circuit design,^{[LS]} computer networks,^{[AOS]} and static program analysis.^{[FLL]} His work on program analysis from PLDI 2002 won the Most Influential PLDI Paper Award for 2012. In addition, he is one of the authors of the master theorem for divide-and-conquer recurrences.^{[BHS]}

While a high school student, Saxe won the United States of America Mathematical Olympiad. In 1974, as a student at Union College, Saxe took part in the William Lowell Putnam Mathematical Competition; his place in the top five scores earned him a Putnam Fellowship. He graduated from Union College in 1976,, and earned his Ph.D. in 1985 from Carnegie Mellon University, under the supervision of Jon Bentley.

== Selected publications ==
BHS.	Bentley, Jon Louis; Haken, Dorothea; Saxe, James B. (September 1980), "A general method for solving divide-and-conquer recurrences", ACM SIGACT News, 12 (3): 36–44, doi:10.1145/1008861.1008865, S2CID 40642274

FSS.	Furst, Merrick; Saxe, James B.; Sipser, Michael (1984), "Parity, circuits, and the polynomial-time hierarchy", Mathematical Systems Theory, 17 (1): 13–27, doi:10.1007/BF01744431, MR 0738749, S2CID 14677270

LS.	Leiserson, Charles E.; Saxe, James B. (1991), "Retiming synchronous circuitry", Algorithmica, 6 (1): 5–35, CiteSeerX 10.1.1.368.3222, doi:10.1007/BF01759032, MR 1079368, S2CID 18674287

AOS.	Anderson, Thomas E.; Owicki, Susan S.; Saxe, James B.; Thacker, Charles P. (November 1993), "High-speed switch scheduling for local-area networks", ACM Transactions on Computer Systems, 11 (4): 319–352, doi:10.1145/161541.161736, S2CID 53244607

FLL.	Flanagan, Cormac; Leino, K. Rustan M.; Lillibridge, Mark; Nelson, Greg; Saxe, James B.; Stata, Raymie (May 2002), "Extended static checking for Java", Proceedings of PLDI 2002, SIGPLAN Notices, 37 (5): 234–245, doi:10.1145/543552.512558

DNS.	Detlefs, David; Nelson, Greg; Saxe, James B. (2005), "Simplify: a theorem prover for program checking", Journal of the ACM, 52 (3): 365–473, doi:10.1145/1066100.1066102, MR 2146512, S2CID 9613854
