= Akra–Bazzi method =

Method in computer science

In computer science, the Akra–Bazzi method, or Akra–Bazzi theorem, is used to analyze the asymptotic behavior of the mathematical recurrences that appear in the analysis of divide and conquer algorithms where the sub-problems have substantially different sizes. It is a generalization of the master theorem for divide-and-conquer recurrences, which assumes that the sub-problems have equal size. It is named after mathematicians Mohamad Akra and Louay Bazzi.

== Formulation ==
The Akra–Bazzi method applies to recurrence formulas of the form:

$$T(x)=g(x) + \sum_{i=1}^k a_i T(b_i x + h_i(x))\qquad \text{for }x \geq x_0.$$

The conditions for usage are:

- sufficient base cases are provided
- $a_i$ and $b_i$ are constants for all $i$
- $a_i > 0$ for all $i$
- $0 < b_i < 1$ for all $i$
- $\left|g'(x)\right| \in O(x^c)$, where c is a constant and O notates Big O notation
- $\left| h_i(x) \right| \in O\left(\frac{x}{(\log x)^2}\right)$ for all $i$
- $x_0$ is a constant

The asymptotic behavior of $T(x)$ is found by determining the value of $p$ for which $\sum_{i=1}^k a_i b_i^p = 1$ and plugging that value into the equation:

$$T(x) \in \Theta \left( x^p\left( 1+\int_1^x \frac{g(u)}{u^{p+1}}du \right)\right)$$

(see Θ). Intuitively, $h_i(x)$ represents a small perturbation in the index of $T$. By noting that $\lfloor b_i x \rfloor = b_i x + (\lfloor b_i x \rfloor - b_i x)$ and that the absolute value of $\lfloor b_i x \rfloor - b_i x$ is always between 0 and 1, $h_i(x)$ can be used to ignore the floor function in the index. Similarly, one can also ignore the ceiling function. For example, $T(n) = n + T \left(\frac{1}{2} n \right)$ and $T(n) = n + T \left(\left\lfloor \frac{1}{2} n \right\rfloor \right)$ will, as per the Akra–Bazzi theorem, have the same asymptotic behavior.

== Example ==
Suppose $T(n)$ is defined as 1 for integers $0 \leq n \leq 3$ and $n^2 + \frac{7}{4} T \left( \left\lfloor \frac{1}{2} n \right\rfloor \right) + T \left( \left\lceil \frac{3}{4} n \right\rceil \right)$ for integers $n > 3$. In applying the Akra–Bazzi method, the first step is to find the value of $p$ for which $\frac{7}{4} \left(\frac{1}{2}\right)^p + \left(\frac{3}{4} \right)^p = 1$. In this example, $p=2$. Then, using the formula, the asymptotic behavior can be determined as follows:

$$\begin{align}
T(x) & \in \Theta \left( x^p\left( 1+\int_1^x \frac{g(u)}{u^{p+1}}\,du \right)\right) \\
& = \Theta \left( x^2 \left( 1+\int_1^x \frac{u^2}{u^3}\,du \right)\right) \\
& = \Theta(x^2(1 + \ln x)) \\
& = \Theta(x^2\log x).
\end{align}$$

== Significance ==
The Akra–Bazzi method is more useful than most other techniques for determining asymptotic behavior because it covers such a wide variety of cases. Its primary application is the approximation of the running time of many divide-and-conquer algorithms. For example, in the merge sort, the number of comparisons required in the worst case, which is roughly proportional to its runtime, is given recursively as $T(1) = 0$ and

$$T(n) = T\left(\left\lfloor \frac{1}{2} n \right\rfloor \right) + T\left(\left\lceil \frac{1}{2} n \right\rceil \right) + n - 1$$

for integers $n > 0$, and can thus be computed using the Akra–Bazzi method to be $\Theta(n \log n)$.

== See also ==
- Master theorem (analysis of algorithms)
- Asymptotic complexity
