= Nümbrecht =

- Municipality
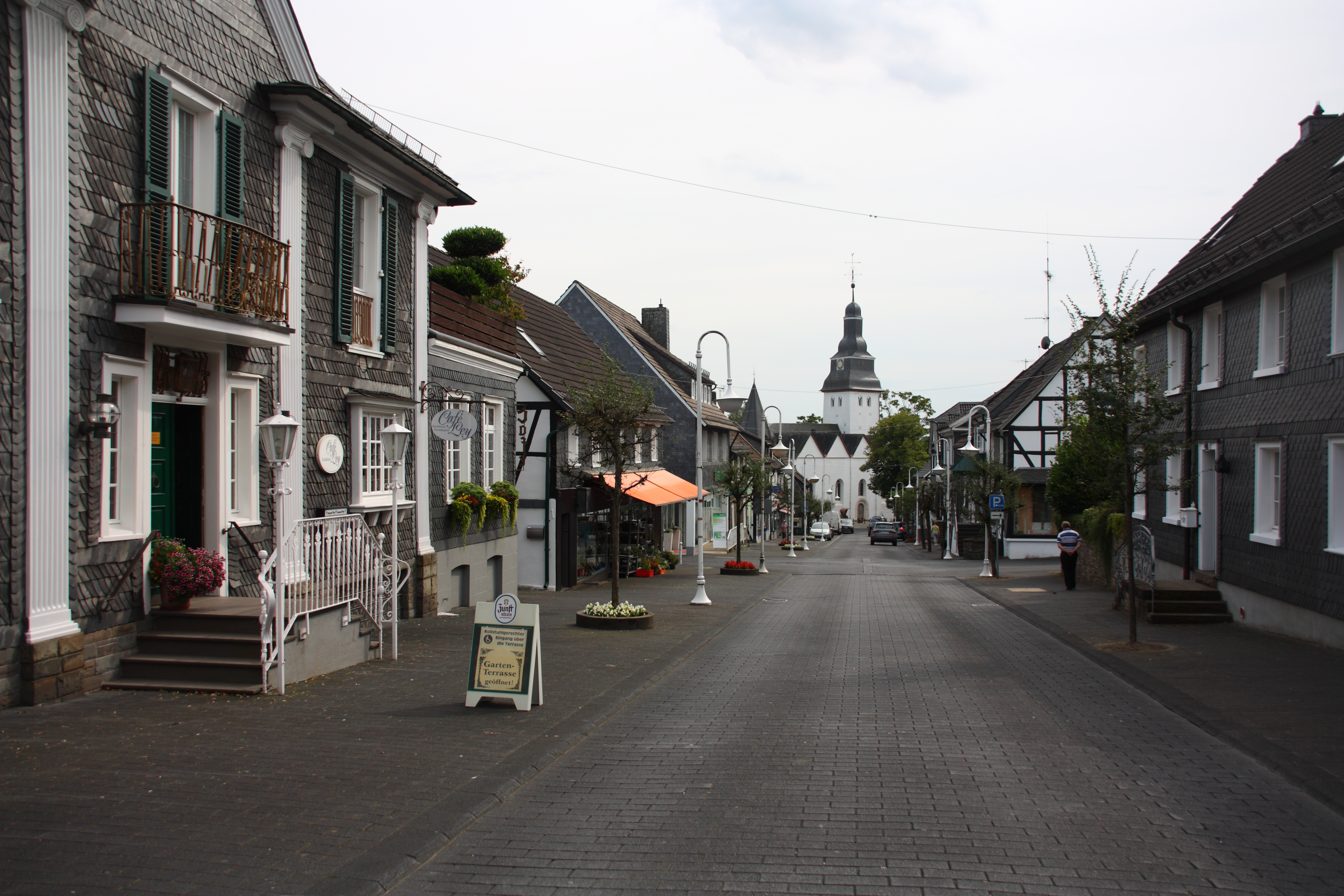

- Flag Coat of arms

- Location of Nümbrecht within Oberbergischer Kreis district
- Interactive map of Nümbrecht
- Location within Germany Location within North Rhine-Westphalia
- Coordinates: 50°54′19″N 7°32′32″E
- Country: Germany
- State: North Rhine-Westphalia
- Admin. region: Köln
- District: Oberbergischer Kreis

Government
  - Mayor (2020–25): Hilko Redenius (CDU)

Area
  - Total: 71.78 km^{2} (27.71 sq mi)
- Elevation: 350 m (1,150 ft)

Population (2025-12-31)
  - Total: 17,529
  - Density: 244.2/km^{2} (632.5/sq mi)
- Time zone: UTC+01:00 (CET)
  - Summer (DST): UTC+02:00 (CEST)
- Postal codes: 51588
- Dialling codes: 02293, 02245, 02262, 02291, 02295
- Vehicle registration: GM
- Website: www.nuembrecht.de

Nümbrecht (German pronunciation: [ˈnʏmbʁɛçt]) is a municipality in the state of Oberbergischer Kreis, in North Rhine-Westphalia, Germany. Nümbrecht is a health resort, known for its good climate.

== Geography ==
Nümbrecht is located about 40 km east of Cologne.

=== Division of the town ===
- Auf der Hardt
- Abbenroth
- Ahebruch
- Alsbach
- Bierenbachtal
- Breunfeld
- Benroth
- Berkenroth
- Breitewiese
- Brünglinghausen
- Bruch
- Büschhof
- Buch
- Distelkamp
- Drinsahl
- Elsenroth
- Erlinghausen
- Friedenthal
- Gaderoth
- Grünthal
- Grunewald
- Göpringhausen
- Gerhardsiefen
- Grötzenberg
- Geringhausen
- Geringhauser Mühle
- Guxmühlen
- Hammermühle
- Hardt
- Harscheid
- Hasenberg
- Homburg Bröl
- Heide
- Heisterstock
- Hillenbach
- Hochstraßen
- Höferhof
- Hömel
- Homburger Papiermühle
- Huppichteroth
- Kleinhöhe
- Krahm
- Kurtenbach
- Langenbach
- Linde
- Lindscheid -Lindscheid Mühle
- Loch
- Löhe
- Malzhagen
- Marienberghausen
- Mildsiefen
- Mühlenthal
- Nallingen
- Neuenberg
- Neuroth
- Nümbrecht
- Niederbröl
- Niederbreidenbach
- Niederelben
- Niederstaffelbach
- Nöchel
- Oberbierenbach
- Oberbech
- Oberstaffelbach
- Oberbreidenbach
- Ödinghausen
- Oberelben
- Prombach
- Riechenbach
- Rommelsdorf
- Röttgen
- Rose
- Stockheim
- Schönhausen
- Schönthal
- Spreitgen
- Stranzenbach
- Straße
- Überdorf
- Unter der Hardt
- Vorholz
- Winterborn
- Windhausen
- Wirtenbach
- Wolfscharre

== History ==
The history of Nümbrecht dates back to 1131, when it was first mentioned in a document called the "Papal Possession Confirmation for the Inhabitants of Bonn Saint Cassiusstift" (document firsamingst n of Oberbergischer places by Klaus Pampus). The first written form of the name was "Nuenbret", while evidence suggests that people have inhabited this area since the Stone Age, the recorded history of the community begins in the early Middle Ages.

Between the year 600 and 700, the first settlements in the Oberberg area started to emerge. It is believed that Nümbrecht already existed as a settlement between the year 768 and 918, with its name meaning "measured district for a new settlement". The Evangelical Church of Nümbrecht was likely constructed in 955, marking an important milestone in Nümbrecht's history.

During the period between the year 900 and 1200, the settlement of Marienberghausen was established. On December 1, 1264, the story of Homburg's dominion began with the acquisition of the county of Sayn by Gottfried I. From 1268 to 1276, Gottfried I built "Castle Homburg" as his residence. In 1359, the Count of Sayn married the daughter of the last Count of Wittgenstein, expanding their name to "Count of Sayn-Wittgenstein".

In 1665, the chapel of Marienberghausen was transformed into a church, which has retained its building to this day. The Homburg dynasty ceased to exist in 1743, and the dominion fell to the House of Sayn-Wittgenstein-Berleburg. In 1792, Christian Heinrich, Count of Sayn-Wittgenstein-Berleburg, gained recognition as a sovereign state.

In 1806, Friedrich Albert, the son of Christian Heinrich, lost his official power as a sovereign due to the establishment of the Rhine Alliance. This marked the end of the Homburgian government after 530 years. In 1808, both Marien Nümbrecht and Marienberghausen were established and incorporated into the Napoleonic Grand Duchy of Berg.

In 1813, French rule in the municipality came to an end, and the Marien municipalities were renamed as mayor's offices, falling under Prussian supremacy. In 1845, the Rhine local code was released, leading to the first municipal council elections in Nümbrecht and Marienberghausen.

In 1933, the government fell into the hands of members of the NSDAP, and anxiety and arbitrariness dominated Nümbrecht for 12 years. In 1946, democratic order was restored, and a new municipal council was elected. In 1968, the administrations of both Nümbrecht and Marienberghausen were merged.

In 1969, the current community of Nümbrecht was formed with the implementation of the "Law about the Reorganization of the Oberbergischer Kreis". In 1973, Nümbrecht received national recognition as an air spa from the Minister of Work, Health, and Social Duties. In 1987, it gained national recognition as a well-being climatic spa. Over the years, numerous health and leisure facilities have been developed and expanded.

The Nümbrecht high school was founded in 1992, followed by the establishment of the Sophie Scholl school in 1994. In 1995, the Rhein-Sieg Clinic, specializing in orthopedics and neurology, was opened on Höhenstrasse in Nümbrecht. In 2003, Nümbrecht became the first local authority district in North Rhine-Westphalia to receive the environmental brand "Viabono," which signifies environment-friendly tourism. Additionally, Nümbrecht was classified as a premium-class remedial-climatic health resort.

== Population ==
Historical population

| Year | Pop. | ±% p.a. |
|---|---|---|
| 1965 | 9,846 | — |
| 1970 | 10,122 | +0.55% |
| 1975 | 10,737 | +1.19% |
| 1980 | 11,290 | +1.01% |
| 1985 | 11,646 | +0.62% |
| 1990 | 14,266 | +4.14% |
| 1995 | 16,526 | +2.98% |

| Year | Pop. | ±% p.a. |
|---|---|---|
| 2000 | 16,930 | +0.48% |
| 2005 | 17,420 | +0.57% |
| 2010 | 17,226 | −0.22% |
| 2015 | 17,002 | −0.26% |
| 2020 | 17,068 | +0.08% |
| 2025 | 17,529 | +0.53% |

Source: Landesdatabank Nordrhein-Westfalen

== Coat of arms ==
The coat of arms was initially granted on January 4, 1936, and subsequently in 1969. It bears a striking resemblance to the coat of arms of the Homburg Estate, which was owned by the Counts of Sayn-Wittgenstein-Berleburg. Additionally, the castle featured in the coat of arms also represents the district. The Homburg is located within the municipality, and above the left tower, the coat of arms displays the emblem of the Counts themselves.

== Culture ==
=== Art Society of Nümbrecht ===
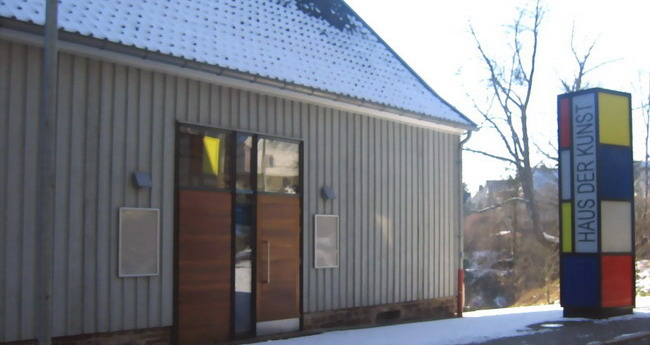
House of art

In 1983, the Nümbrecht Art Association was founded. Various exhibitions take place in the art gallery in Nümbrecht. The sculptures were a gift from the Nümbrecht Art Association to the municipality of Nümbrecht for the embellishment of the health resort.

=== Sculpture ===
The sculptures were a gift from the Nümbrecht Art Association to the municipality of Nümbrecht to beautify the health resort.

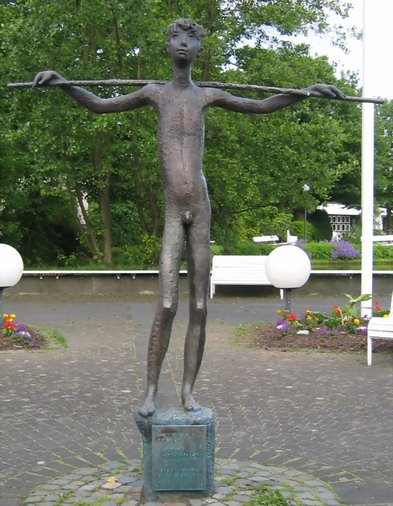
Helmut

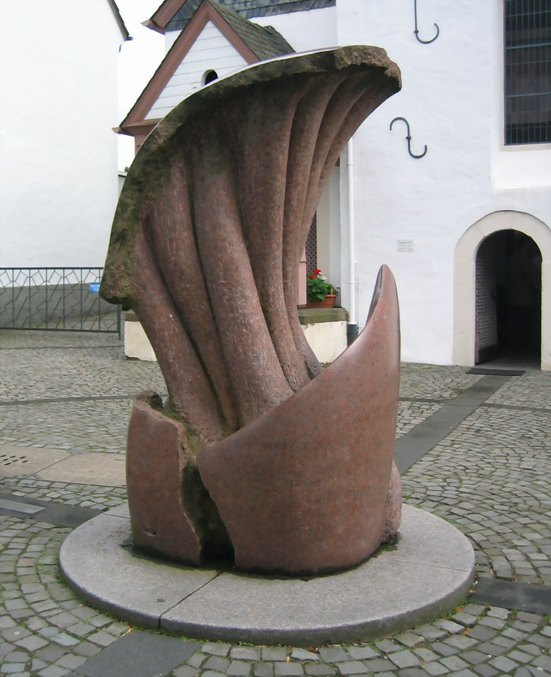
The caducity

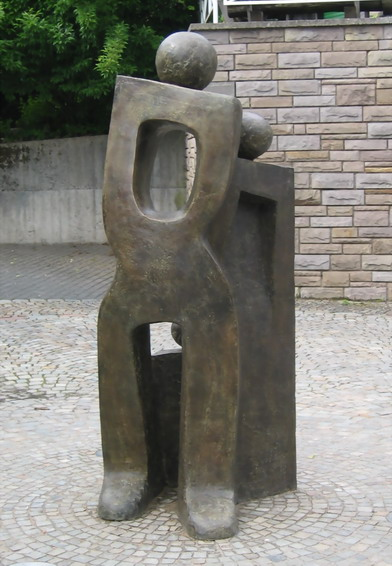
A Dream

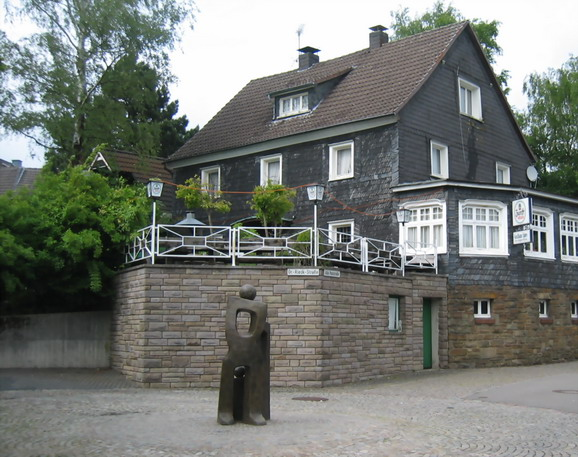
A Dream

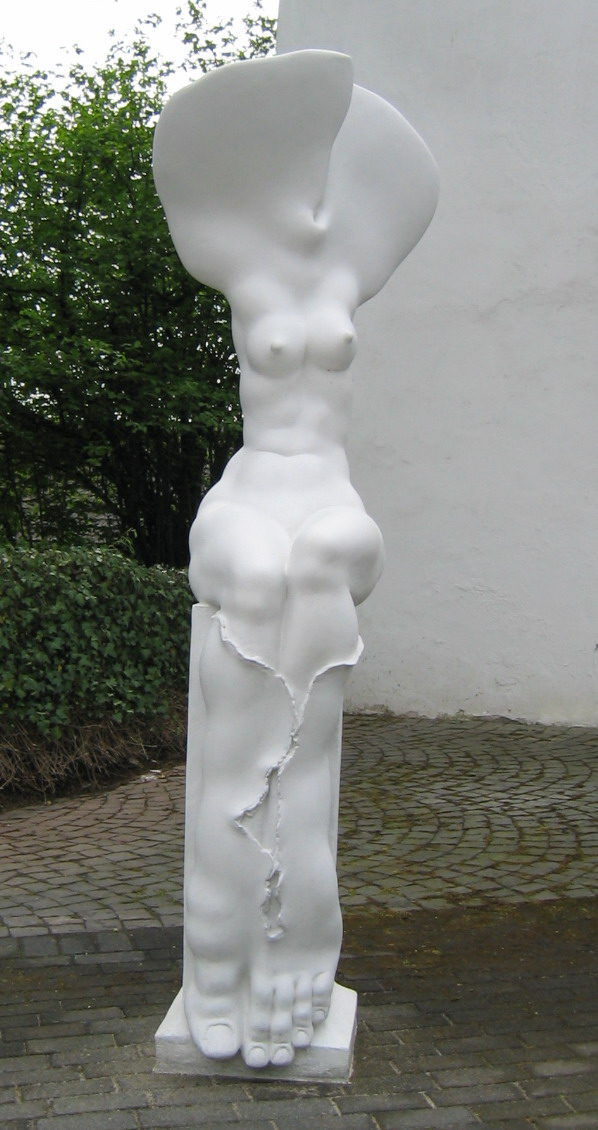
Natur – Ginkgo leaf with female form

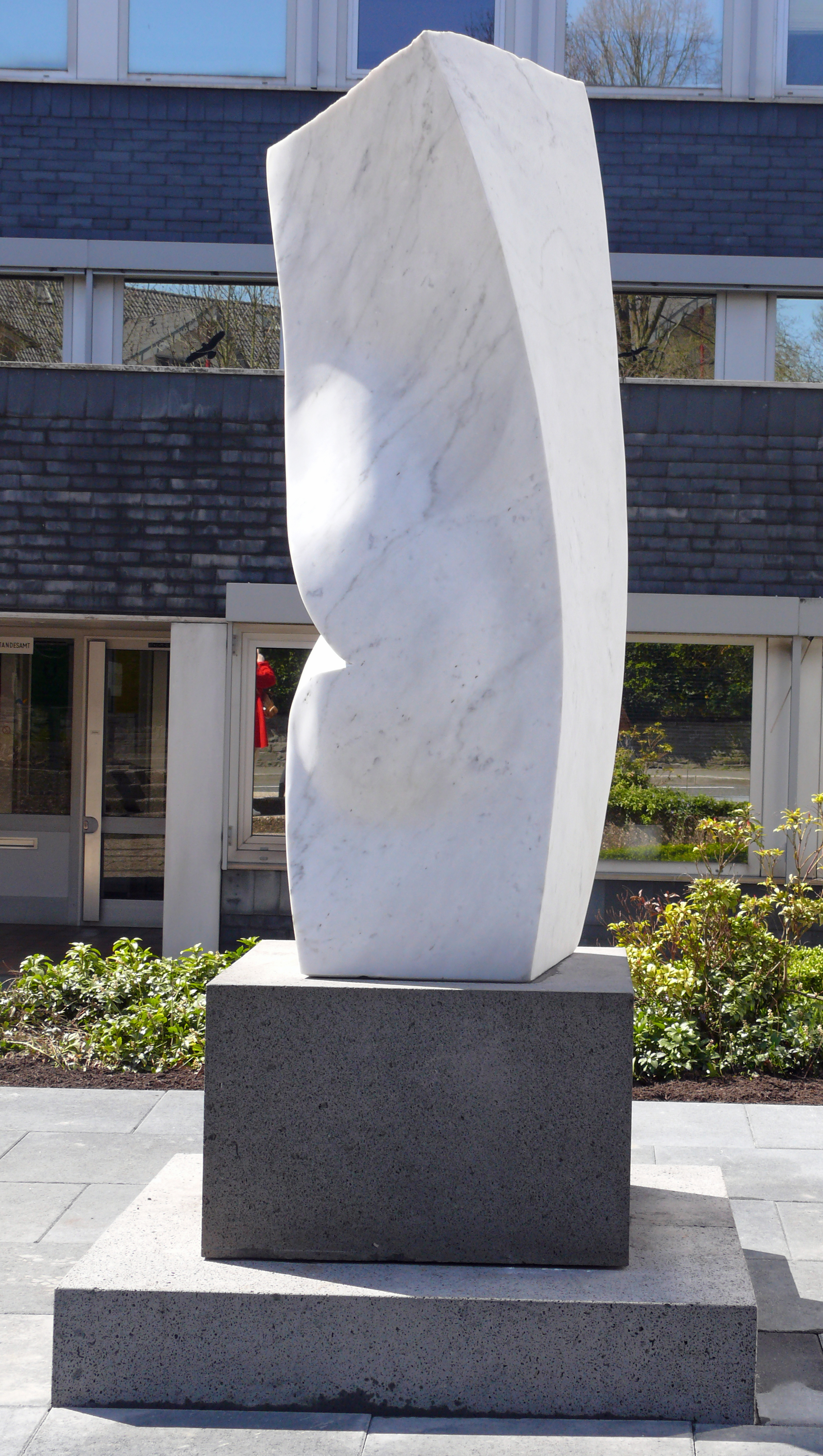
Power II

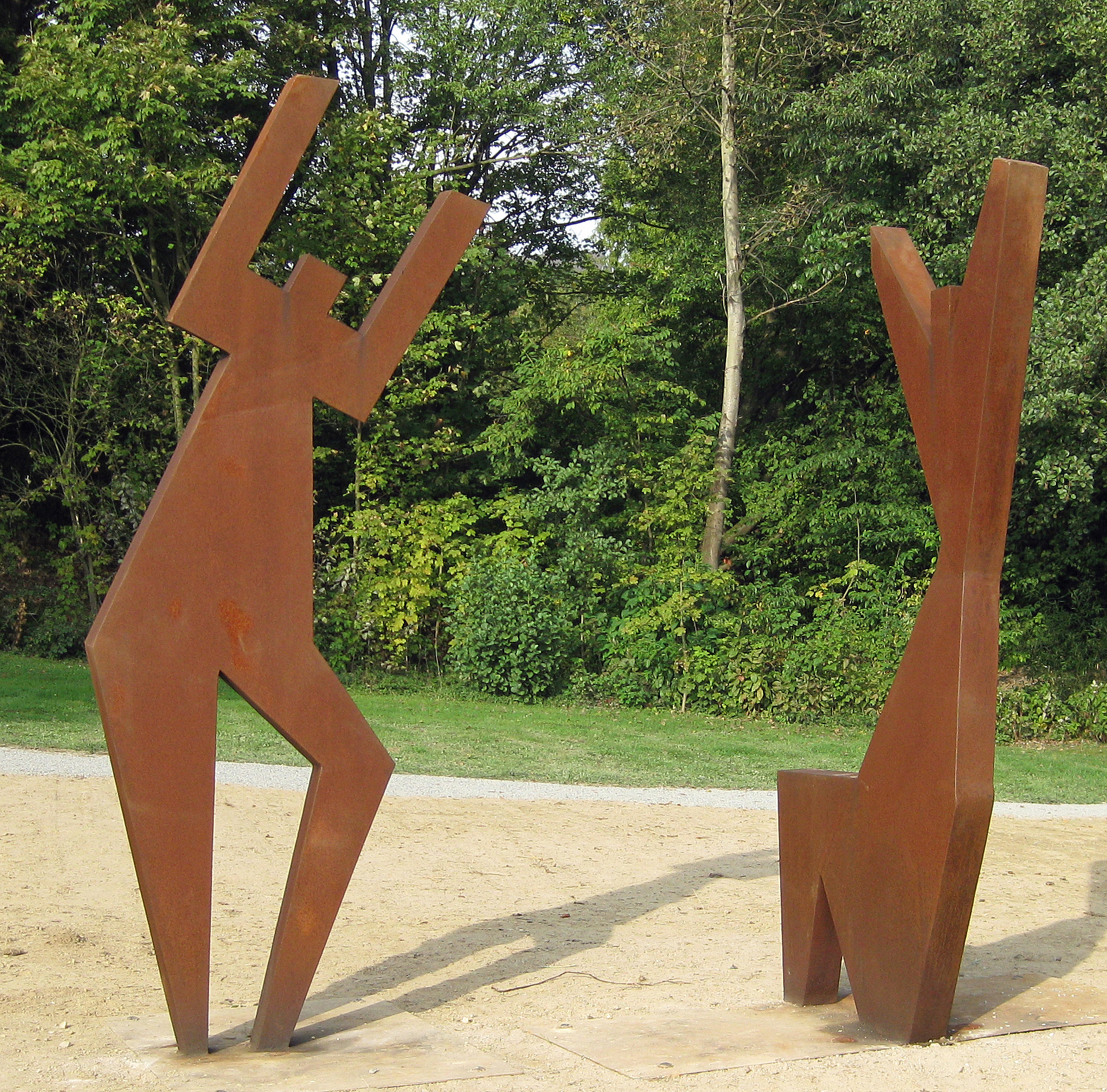
Metal Sculpture

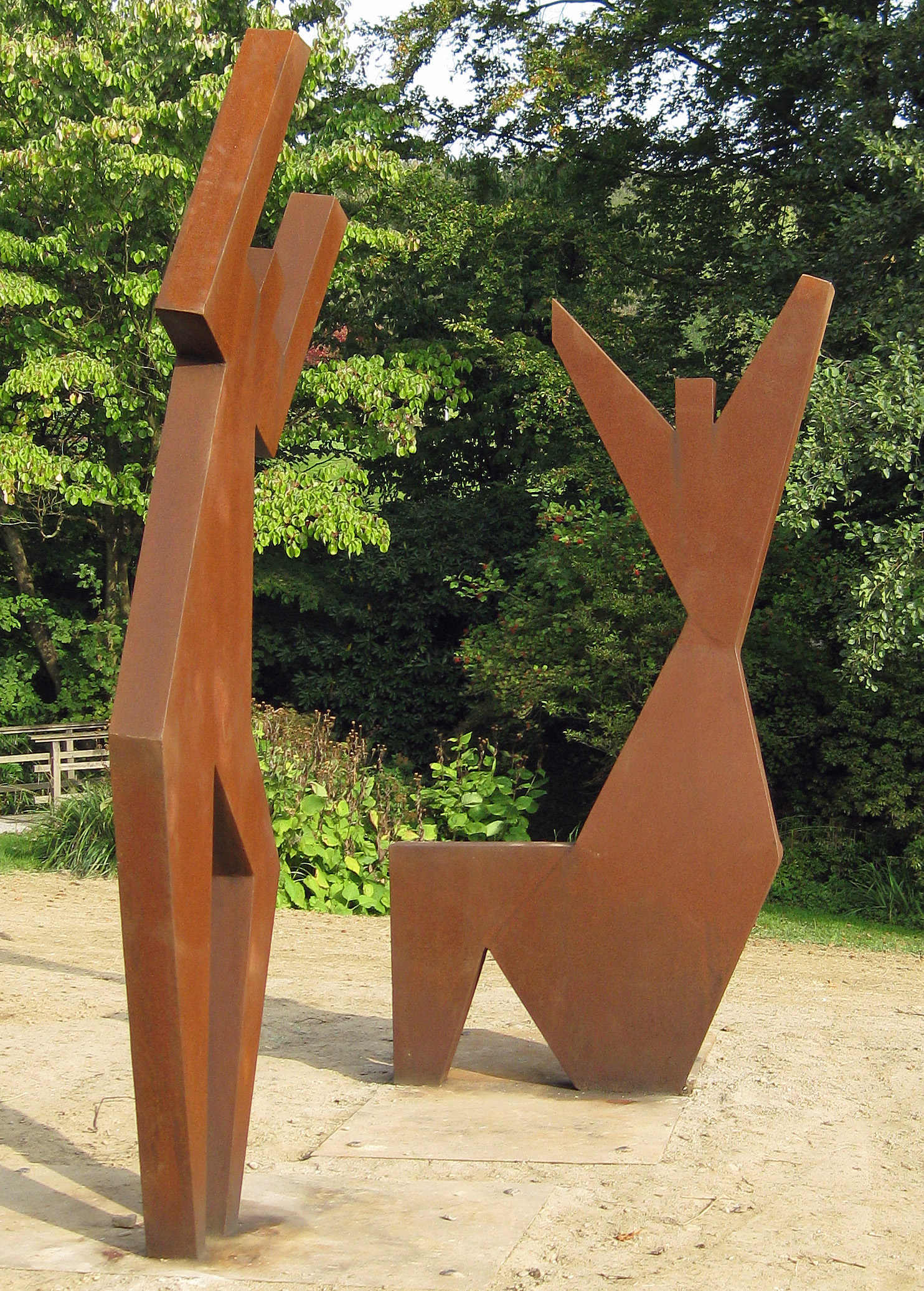
Metal Sculpture
- In 1983 "The boy with putting" called "Helmut". This sculpture was created by Prof. Dr. Paschke from Düsseldorf. This sculpture stands on the pond place.
- In 1996 The sculpture "The transitoriness" has stood since 1996 in the churchyard of the Evangelical church. It was provided by the Mühlheim sculptor Georg Weber.
- In 2003 "of The cornerstones', altar cross in the Evangelical church. Stone, bronze, gold leaf of Kassiel collier, Berlin [donated from limbs of the Evangelical church municipality]
- In 2005 "a dream" The piece of art of the sculptor living in field Breun Rose Gilissen-Vanmarcke was initiated on Saturday, June 4, 2005. The sculpture stands on the small place in old Poststrasse.
- 13 May 2006 sculpture "nature - recollections of a tree' from sculptor Michael Schwarze in Marktstrasse before the historically significant house Mehlau built in 1746 of the chamberlain's Johann Georg milk bag in Nümbrecht.
- 19 April 2008 "strength II" this sculpture was created by the artist Peter Rübsam, it stands before the new city hall square.
- 28 September 2009 metal Sculpture of Rose Gilissen. This sculpture is on loan to the Nümbrecht Art Association. The sculpture stands in the health resort park of Nümbrecht, below the column well.

== Sights ==
=== Watchtower ===
The 30-metre high watchtower at the "Lindchen" in Nümbrecht has 154 steps; the top of the tower is 371 metres above sea level. From the top, one can see the Rhine, the Siebengebirge mountain range and even as far as the Rothaargebirge mountain range.

=== Amiger tunnel ===
This iron ore mining tunnel known as the Amiger tunnel is approximately 200 to 300 years old. The Amiger tunnel is situated in a forest area called "In the Goldkaule", below the "Alfred Lang" hut and the watchtower. The tunnel is approximately 20 metres long. However, according to local legends, the tunnel goes as far as the village Ödinghausen. Today, the entry to the tunnel is covered by a grating and only the bats know where the tunnel leads...

=== Benroth ===
The "ecovillage" Benroth is about five kilometres from Nümbrecht. The conversion of Benroth into an "ecological village of the future" required some measures, such as the installation of a moist biotope and drystone-wallings. The one-hour tour "ecomile" through the village shares insight into the projects.

=== Half timbering ===
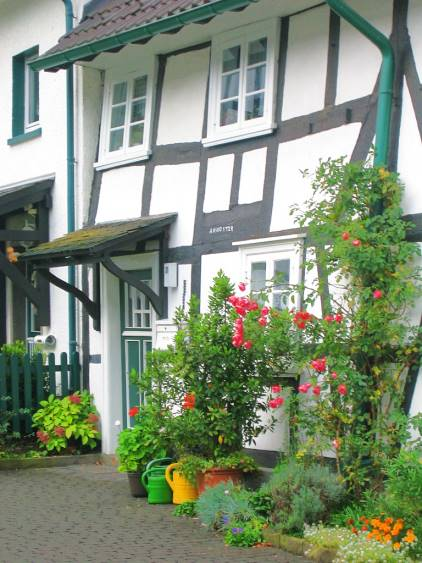
The oldest house in Bruch (1728)

There are a number of well-preserved half-timbered houses in the small village of Bruch, northeast of Nümbrecht. Most of these date back to the 19th century. Some were built on the foundation walls of the previous houses.

=== Remarkable rocks ===
Near Nümbrecht, small quartzite monadnocks from the Devonian period (approximately 360 million years ago) were exposed by the erosion of softer sedimentary rock. Crinoids ("sea lily") and brachiopod fossils have been discovered here. They are neither erratic blocks from the ice age nor meteorites, as was formerly believed.

=== Witches' ponds ===
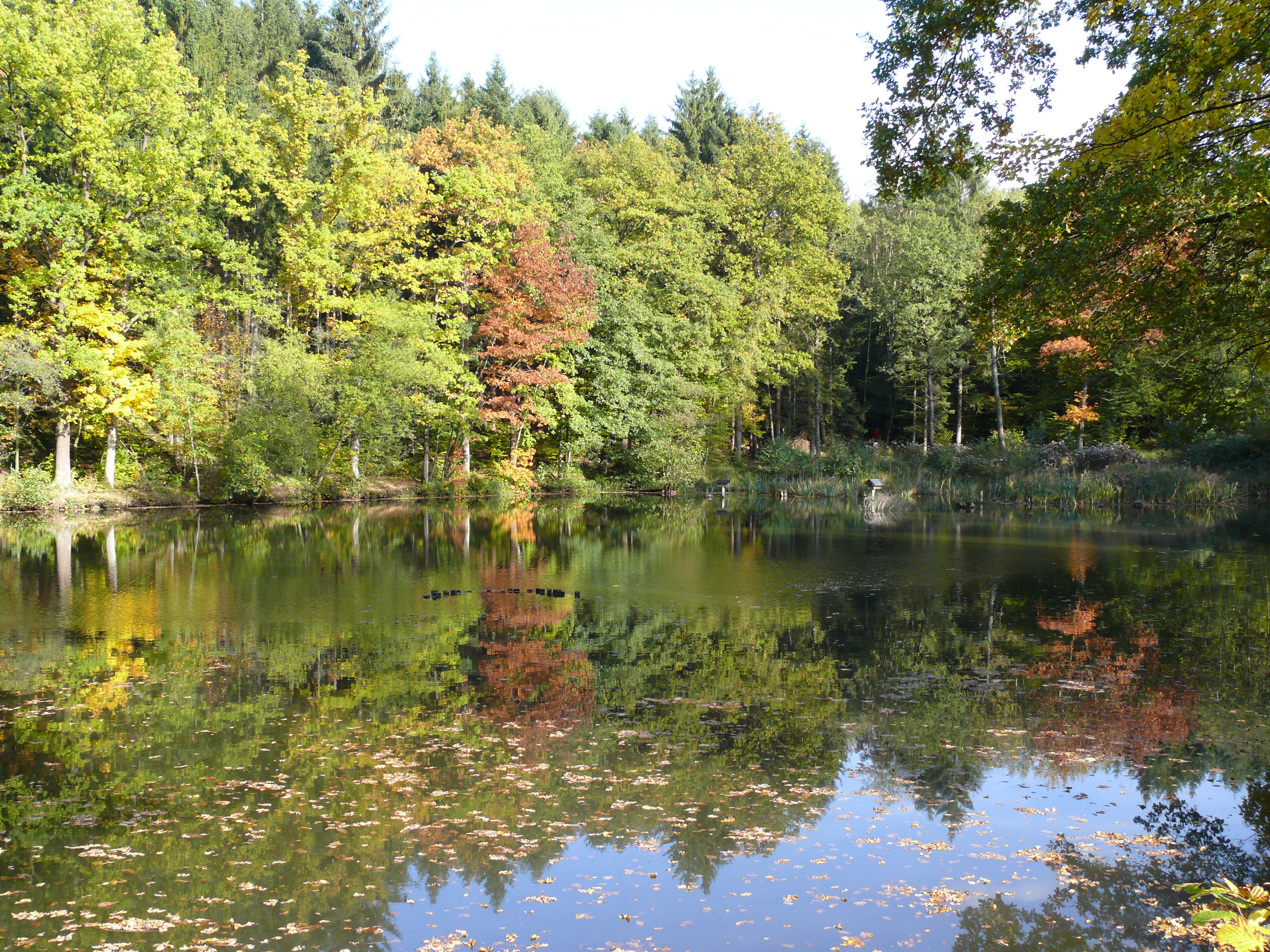
Witches' ponds

Two ponds below the nearby village of Spreitgen are known as Hexenweiher ("witches' ponds"). It is not known whether the name derives from actual witchcraft trials by dunking during the Middle Ages. During these trials, suspected witches were thrown into a pond with their hands cuffed and their feet tied together. If they went under and drowned, they were considered innocent. If they survived, they were "proven" to be witches and often burnt. Castle Homburg is a historic site of witchcraft trials. During a trial on 14 September 1631, for example, six women were accused of practicing witchcraft. Because they confessed, they were given "mercy" and beheaded instead of being burnt alive.

=== Churches ===
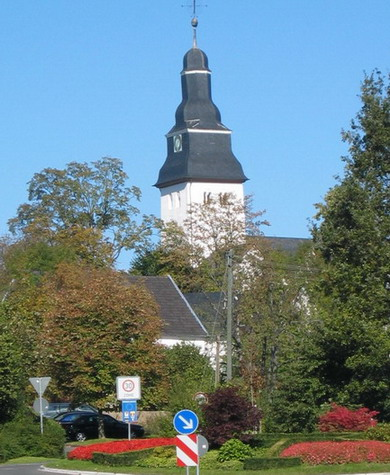
Ev. church Nümbrecht

The 1000-year-old church next to the castle in Nümbrecht is one of the most interesting sacred buildings in the area: the tower was built in Romanesque style, the romanesque part of the interior features massive medieval pillars and reinforcing arches. The ribbed structure of the apses is typical of Gothic style. Flat vaults were added at the end of the 17th century. The top construction of the tower and the altar reflects Baroque architecture.

The church "Bunte Kerke" in Marienberghausen features medieval wall paintings. The building was changed and reconstructed several times and thus lost its original appearance of a typical fortified church. The west tower is all that is left of the original 12th-century building. The late Gothic paintings in the interior are preserved however. The paintings were painted over during the Protestant Reformation period and only resurfaced when the organ was renovated in 1910. Only a couple of gothic wall paintings in the area have been preserved to this day.

=== Marienberghausen ===
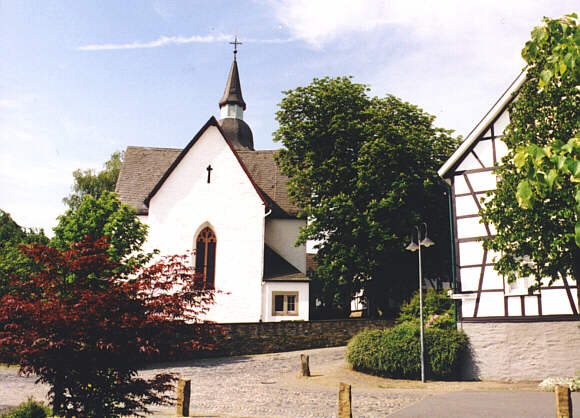
Protestant church at Marienberghausen

In both 1969 and 1991, Marienberghausen won the German federal competition "Unser Dorf soll schöner werden" ("Our village shall become more beautiful"). It is also the birthplace of the opera Hänsel and Gretel, composed here by Engelbert Humperdinck and also first performed here.

=== Mail coach ===
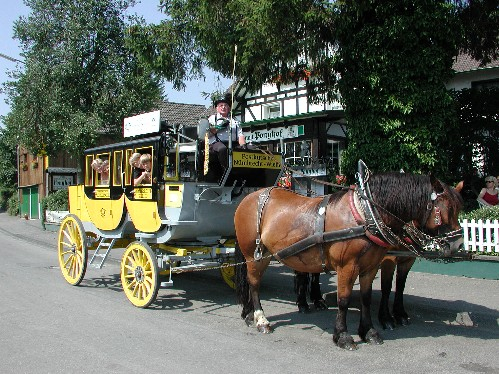

The "Oberbergische Postkutsche", a mail coach, runs between Nümbrecht and Wiehl every Friday, Saturday and Sunday from May to the end of October. It is a reproduction of the mail coach of the Imperial Post Office from approximately 1871.

=== Homburg Castle ===
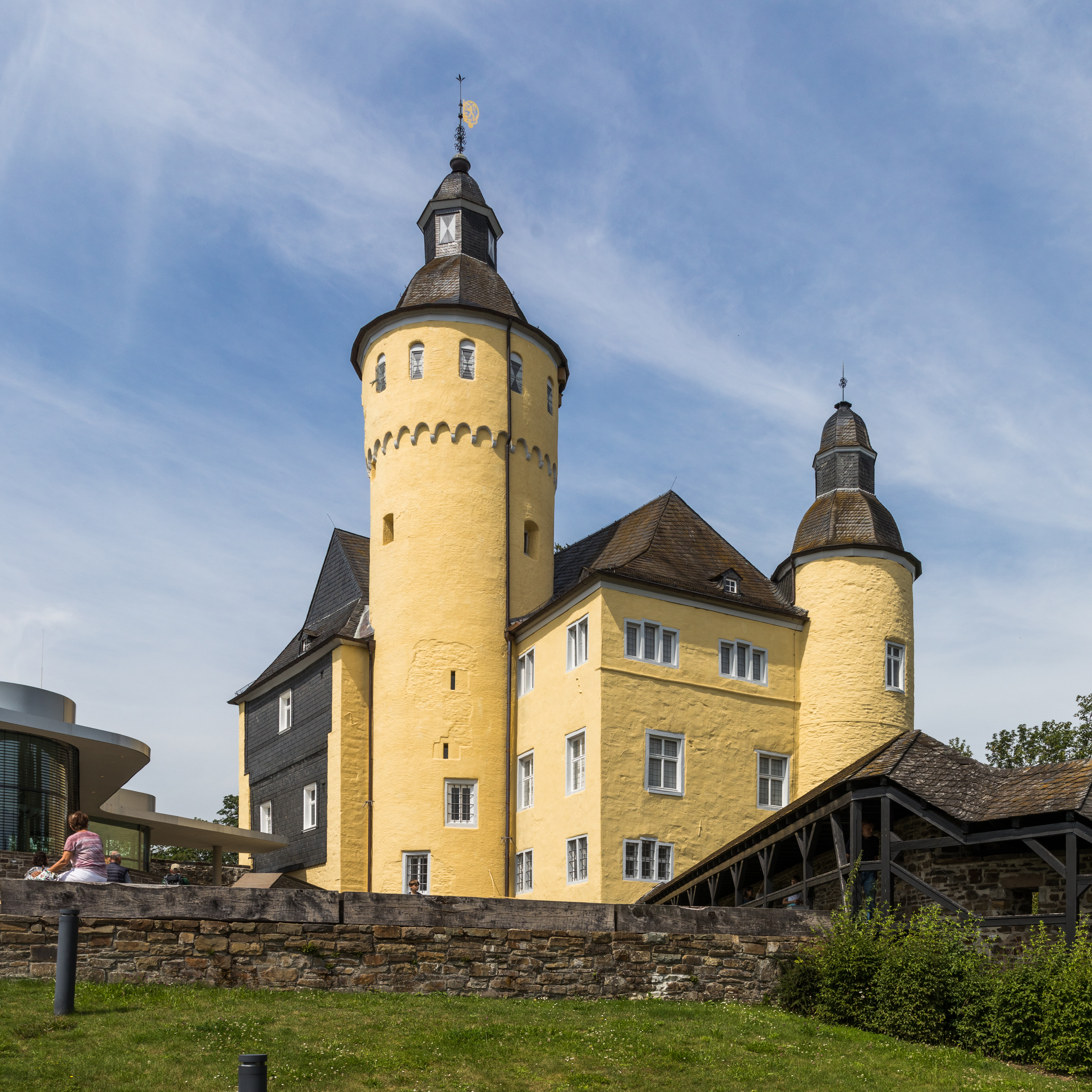
Homburg Castle

=== Health resort park ===
==== Column well in the health resort park ====
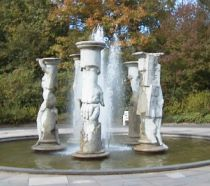
Column well

The column well fountain in the health resort park was created by sculptor Michael Schwarze. It was built for the horticultural show (Landesgartenschau) held in Nürmbrecht in 1974. The figures of the well symbolize the age-old will of humans to free themselves from obligations of life. The female figures are the symbols of beauty and fertility, while the fists express force and assertiveness. The hand is an indication of understanding and work. The male leg stands for progress and conquest.

==== Berlin place ====
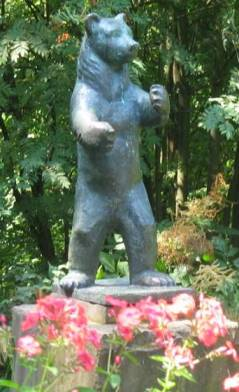
Berliner bear

The Berlin bear is a present of the Senate of Berlin. He was put up shortly before the land garden show in 1974 in the health resort park. Berlin citizens could spend a free vacation in Nümbrecht, as promoted by the county of North Rhine-Westphalia.

==== Special supplies of the health resort ====
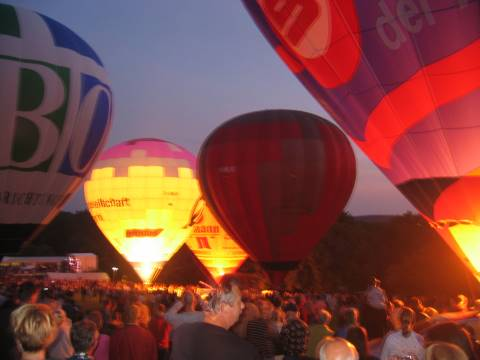
Balloon glow during the light festival

- Light festival in the health resort park, always on the 2nd week-end in July
- Christmas art market, the last week-end before the 1st Advent
- Health resort concerts in the health resort hall or Rhine Sieg Clinic (Rhein-Sieg-Klinik, named after the two rivers), Sunday 15.00 o'clock

== Industry ==
In the municipality, the three industrial zones are namely in Elsenroth, Gaderoth and Breunfeld. The most different companies reside there.

The biggest employer in municipality is the SARSTEDT Verwaltungs AG with factories in the villages of Rommelsdorf and Winterborn. The company develops, produces and sells machines and consumable materials for medicine and science. It was founded in 1961 and now employs 2,250 people worldwide.

Similarly, the KABE LABORTECHNIK GmbH in Elsenroth is a bigger medical technology company, founded in 1983. It develops, produces and sells machines and consumable materials for medicine.

== Recreation ==
=== Clubs and societies ===
- Heimatverein Nümbrecht
- DLRG
- Senioreninsel
- Ballonsportclub
- Karateverein
- Landfrauenverein
- BürgerBus - Verein
- Bürgerzentrum e.V.
- Partnerschaftsverein
- Kneipp-Verein
- Homburger Bienenzuchtverein
- Aktionsgemeinschaft
- Sportfischen e. V
- Handwerkerverein
- Motorsportclub Nümbrecht e. V. im ADAC
- SSV Homburg-Nümbrecht
- Freiwillige Feuerwehr Nümbrecht
- TC Blau-Gelb Nümbrecht e. V.
- MGV Nümbrecht
- Förderkreis Kultur Nümbrecht e. V
- Partnerschaftsverein Nümbrecht-Gouvieux
- Partnerschaftsverein Nümbrecht-Megliot
- Kinderchor - Homburger Spatzen
- Mennoniten-Brüdergemeinde e. V. (Evangelische Freikirche)

=== Bicycle lane ===
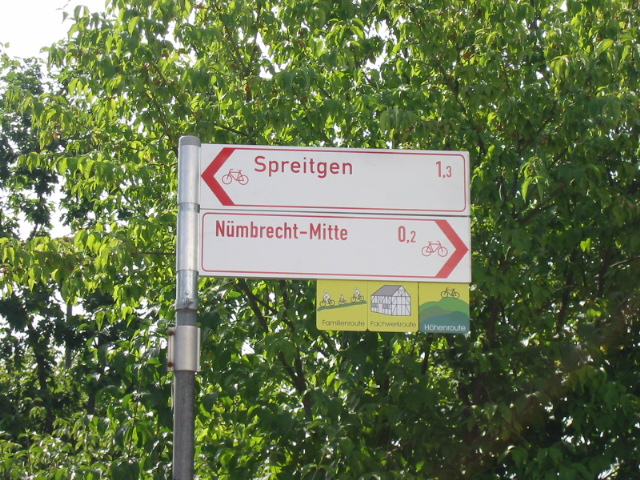
directory

3 Subjects-engaged bicycle tours exist in municipality Nümbrecht.

- Family tour
- High tour
- Half-timbered tour

== Schools in the municipality ==
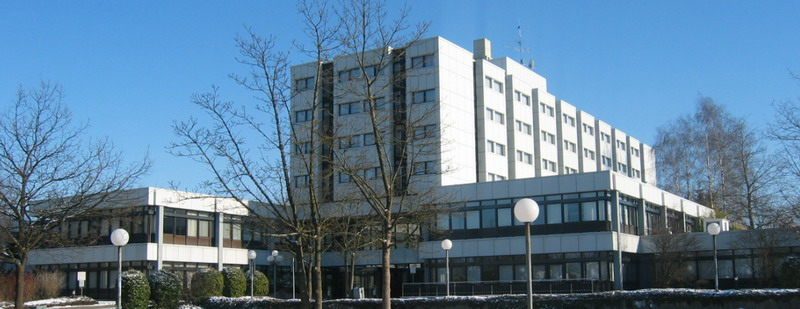
House Nümbrecht

- Gemeinschaftsgrund- und Hauptschulen (elementary schools)
- Sophie-Scholl-Realschule Nümbrecht (secondary modern)
- Gymnasium Nümbrecht
- Educational site - House Nümbrecht

== Natives of the municipality ==
- Karl Heckmann, regional historian (1866–1943)
- Otto Kaufmann, regional historian (d. 1985)
- Carl Koch (1892–1962), film director
- Thomas Lang (1967–), author
- Robert Ley (1890–1945), leading Nazi Party member
- Walter Peitgen (1915–1990), former mayor
- Heinz-Otto Peitgen (1945–), mathematician
- Julia Prejmerean-Aston (1952–), painter

== Congregations ==
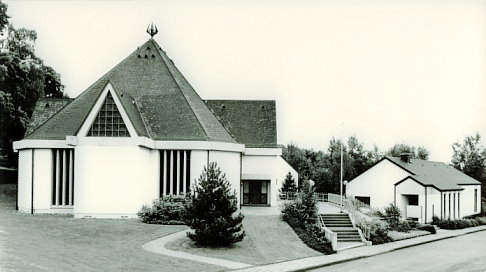
Catholic church Nümbrecht

- Evangelical Lutheran church municipality Nümbrecht.
- Evangelical Lutheran church municipality Marienberghausen.
- Roman Catholic church municipality Nümbrecht, Hl. Spirit.

== Memorials ==
- Warrior's monument for the dead people of 1. and 2. world war.
- The memorial in the Jewish cemetery was initiated on 28 May 1995. It originated with the help of an engaged working group in the municipality in collaboration with the sculptor Marianne Roetzel from Harscheid. On old cobblestones there lies a stone tablet, this is complemented with seven columns. They symbolize Menora, the 7-armed candlestick.
- Stone tablet as a recollection of the former Jewish synagogue on the modern village square.
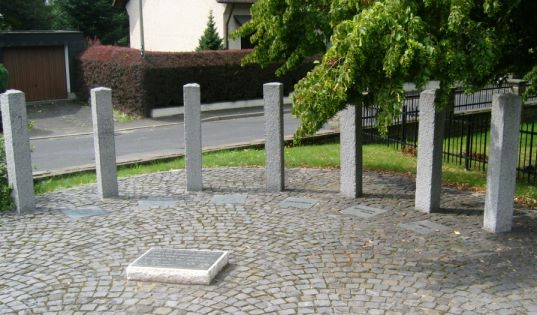
Memorial in the Jewish cemetery

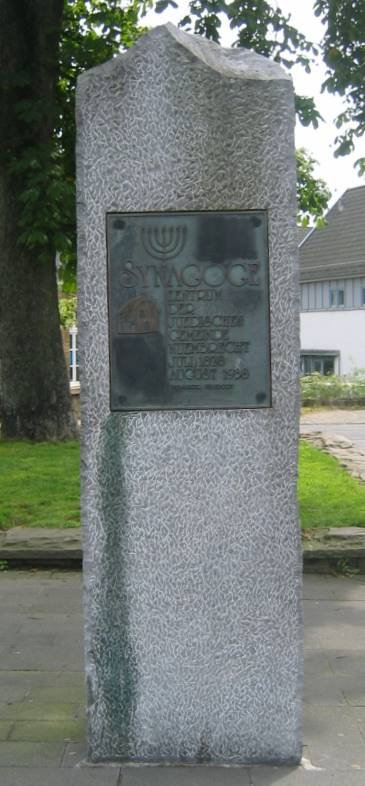
Memorial in the village square

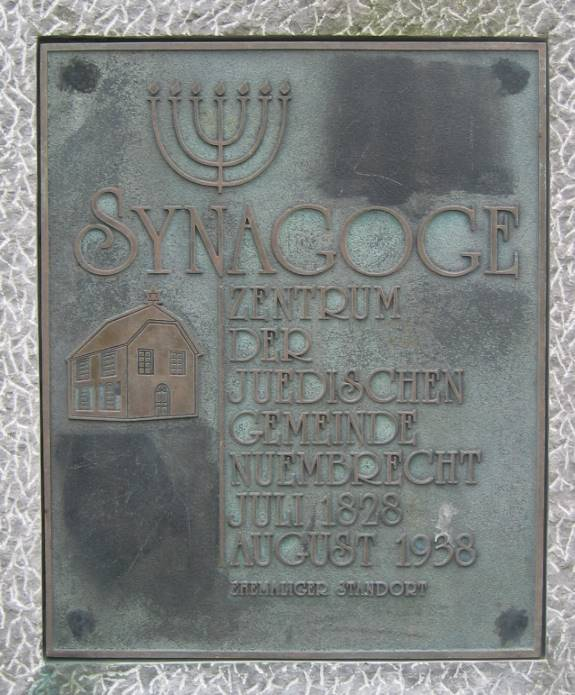
Memorial

== Social facilities ==
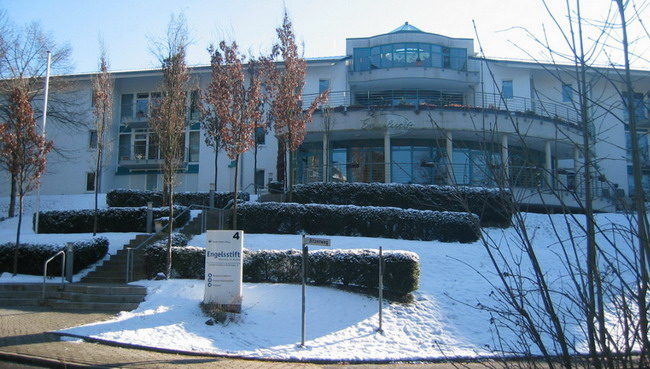
Old care home Engelsstift

- Old care home Engelsstift the Theodor Fliedner foundation.
- Blind home - Ernst-Christoffel home.
- Social welfare work - station Nümbrecht of the prot. church municipality Nümbrecht.

== Twin towns ==
- Gouvieux (France) since 1960
- Mateh Yehuda in Israel, since 8. November 2008

== Literature ==
- Marion Geldmacher, The beginnings of Nümbrecht and Homburg, writings to Rheini history Bd. 4, Cologne 1980
- Karl Heckman, History of the former realm rule Homburg at the Mark, Bonn 1939
- Heinrich Schild, Chronicle of the municipalities Nümbrecht and Marienberghausen, Nümbrecht 1977
