= Heinz-Otto Peitgen =

German mathematician (born 1945)

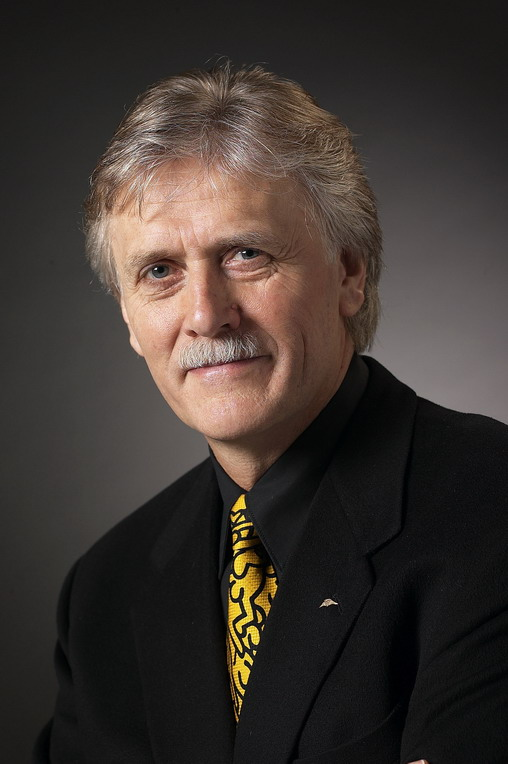

President of Jacobs University
- In office 2013–2014
- Preceded by: Joachim Treusch
- Succeeded by: Antonio Loprieno

Personal details
- Born: Heinz-Otto Peitgen; April 30, 1945 (age 81) Nümbrecht, North Rhine-Westphalia, Germany
- Education: University of Bonn
- Profession: Scientist, University administrator

Heinz-Otto Peitgen (born April 30, 1945 in Bruch, Nümbrecht near Cologne) is a German mathematician and was President of Jacobs University from January 1, 2013 to December 31, 2013. Peitgen contributed to the study of fractals, chaos theory, and medical image computing, as well as helping to introduce fractals to the broader public.

== Life ==
Peitgen studied mathematics, physics and economics from 1965 until 1971 in Bonn, where he received his PhD in 1973. His doctoral dissertation was entitled “Asymptotische Fixpunktsätze und Stabilität” (English: “Asymptotic Fixed-point Theorems and Stability”).

After receiving his habilitation in 1977, he was awarded a professorship in mathematics at the University of Bremen, where he served until 2012. There, he was involved in establishing and developing the Institute for Dynamical Systems, where in 1982 he set up a computer graphics laboratory for mathematical experiments. Since 1992, Peitgen has served as the director of the Center for Complex Systems and Visualization (Centrum für Complexe Systeme und Visualisierung - CeVis) at the University of Bremen. His research specialties include mathematics, computer science and medical image computing, focusing on medical diagnostics and surgery with a particular emphasis on oncology, as well as neurodegenerative and cardio-vascular diseases. At the beginning of his career in 1970 he contributed to computational algebraic topology. Later in the 1980s he spearheaded fractal geometry in computer graphics, and in the early 1990s he introduced chaos theory and fractal geometry into mathematics education and spearheaded reforms in teacher training in the US. The second half of his career was almost entirely devoted to digital applications in medicine, in particular in radiology and surgery.

Peitgen held professorships simultaneously in Germany and the US. From 1985 until 1991, along with his professorship at the University of Bremen, he was also a professor of mathematics at the University of California, Santa Cruz; and from 1991 to 2012 he was a professor of mathematics and biomedical sciences at Florida Atlantic University. Currently, while retired from the University of Bremen, he is a professor emeritus at Florida Atlantic University. In 1995, he founded the not-for-profit Center for Medical Image Computing, MeVis Research GmbH, in Bremen, which became a Fraunhofer Society institute at the beginning of 2009 and is now called the Fraunhofer MEVIS - Institute for Medical Image Computing. Peitgen left the directorship of the institute in 2012, after he retired from the University of Bremen. In 1997, Peitgen and some of his colleagues founded a commercial company, MeVis Medical Solutions AG (de), MMS, which has been listed on the German stock market since 2007. MMS is one of the world’s leading independent producers of software products for image-based medicine, particularly digital radiology. Peitgen served as the Chairman of the Supervisory Board between 2006 and 2015.

Peitgen has been appointed to chairs at several German and American universities and has served as a visiting professor at universities in Belgium, Brazil, Canada, the United States, Mexico and Italy. He is the author of several award-winning books, which were translated into German, Italian, Japanese, Chinese, Polish, and Russian and became worldwide bestsellers. Moreover, he created a series of films that have helped to publicize fractal geometry and chaos theory around the world. He is co-editor of several professional journals.

In 1992, Peitgen was elected as a member of the European Academy of Sciences and Arts and in 2008 as a member of the Goettingen Academy of Sciences. In 2015 he was elected Dean of Class IV - Natural Sciences in the European Academy of Sciences and Arts. In 2015 he was awarded Dr.-Ing.h.c. from the Otto-von-Guericke-Universität Magdeburg for his merits in medical image computing.

== University Leadership ==
On January 1, 2013, Dr. Peitgen took over as President of Jacobs University (Former International University Bremen), Bremen, Germany. He was successor of former President Joachim Treusch. He resigned abruptly from the post at the end of 2013.

== Awards ==
- 1996: Verdienstkreuz 1. Klasse der Bundesrepublik Deutschland
- 1999: Karl Heinz Beckurts-Preis für Forschung und Innovation
- 2005: Werner-Körte-Medaille in Gold der Deutschen Gesellschaft für Chirurgie (DGCH)
- 2006: Inducted as Fellow into the Charles E. Schmidt College of Science Hall of Fame at Florida Atlantic together with Benoit B. Mandelbrot
- 2006: Deutscher Gründerpreis 2006 in der Kategorie „Visionäre“
- 2013: Fraunhofer-Medaille

== Selected books ==
- The Beauty of Fractals, Springer, Heidelberg, 1986 (with P. H. Richter)
- The Science of Fractal Images, Springer Verlag, Tokyo, Springer, New York, 1988 (with D. Saupe)
- Newton's Method and Dynamical Systems, Kluwer Academic Publishers, Dordrecht, 1989
- Fractals for the Classroom – Part One, Springer-Verlag, New York, and NCTM, 1991 (with H. Jürgens and D. Saupe)
- Fractals for the Classroom – Part Two, Springer-Verlag, New York, and NCTM, 1992 (with H. Jürgens and D. Saupe)
- Fractals for the Classroom – Strategic Activities, Vol. 1, Springer-Verlag, New York, and NCTM, 1990 (with H. Jürgens, D. Saupe, E. Maletsky, T. Perciante and L. Yunker)
- Fractals for the Classroom – Strategic Activities, Vol. 2, Springer-Verlag, New York, and NCTM, 1992 (with H. Jürgens, D. Saupe, E. Maletsky, T. Perciante and L. Yunker)
- Fractals for the Classroom – Strategic Activities, Vol. 3, Springer-Verlag, New York, and NCTM, 1999 (with H. Jürgens, D. Saupe, E. Maletsky, T. Perciante)
- Chaos and Fractals: New Frontiers of Science, Springer-Verlag, 1992 (with H. Jürgens and D. Saupe); 2nd edition 2004, ISBN 0387202293

== Notes ==
Press Release Jacobs University 2013
