= Jon Bentley (computer scientist) =

American computer scientist (born 1953)

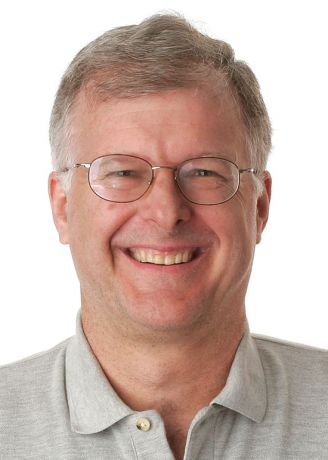
- Born: Jon Louis Bentley; February 20, 1953 (age 73); Long Beach, California, U.S.
- Education: University of North Carolina at Chapel Hill; Stanford University
- Title: Computer Scientist
- Scientific career
- Workplaces: Avaya
- Thesis: Divide and conquer algorithms for closest point problems in multidimensional space (1976)
- Doctoral advisor: Donald Ford Stanat
- Doctoral students: Charles E. Leiserson; Catherine McGeoch; James B. Saxe

Jon Louis Bentley (born February 20, 1953) is an American computer scientist who is known for his contributions to computer programming, algorithms and data structure research.

== Education ==
Bentley received a B.S. in mathematical sciences from Stanford University in 1974. At this time he developed his most cited work, the heuristic-based partitioning algorithm k-d tree, published in 1975.

He received a M.S. and PhD in 1976 from the University of North Carolina at Chapel Hill. While a student, he also held internships at the Xerox Palo Alto Research Center and Stanford Linear Accelerator Center.

== Career ==
After receiving his Ph.D., he taught programming and computer architecture for six years as member of the faculty at Carnegie Mellon University (CMU) as an assistant professor of computer science and mathematics. At CMU, his students included Brian Reid, John Ousterhout, Jeff Eppinger, Joshua Bloch, and James Gosling, and he was one of Charles Leiserson's advisors. He published Writing efficient programs in 1982.

In 1982, Bentley moved to the Computer Science Research Center at Bell Laboratories, where he was Distinguished Member of the Technical Staff. In this period he developed various languages, continued his algorithm research and developed various software and products for communication systems. He co-authored an optimized Quicksort algorithm with Doug McIlroy.

He left Bell Labs in 2001 and worked at Avaya Labs Research until 2013. In this period he developed enterprise communication systems.

He found an optimal solution for the two-dimensional case of Klee's measure problem: given a set of n rectangles, find the area of their union. He and Thomas Ottmann invented the Bentley–Ottmann algorithm, an efficient algorithm for finding all intersecting pairs among a collection of line segments.

He wrote the Programming Pearls column for the Communications of the ACM magazine, and later collected the articles into two books of the same name in 1986 and 1988.

Bentley received the Dr. Dobb's Excellence in Programming award in 2004.

== Personal life ==
He is a mountaineer that has climbed over one hundred 4,000-feet-high peaks in the north-eastern parts of US.

== Bibliography ==
- Programming Pearls, 1986. A second edition appeared in 1999, ISBN 0-201-65788-0.
- More Programming Pearls: Confessions of a Coder, Prentice-Hall, 1988, ISBN 0-201-11889-0.
- Writing Efficient Programs, Prentice-Hall, 1982, ISBN 0-13-970244-X.
- Divide and Conquer Algorithms for Closest Point Problems in Multidimensional Space, Ph.D. thesis.
