= Algebra: Chapter 0 =

Abstract algebra textbook

- Author: Paolo Aluffi
- Language: English
- Series: Graduate Studies in Mathematics
- Subject: Abstract algebra
- Genre: Textbook
- Publisher: American Mathematical Society
- Publication date: 2009
- Publication place: United States
- Pages: 713
- ISBN: 978-0-8218-4781-7

Algebra: Chapter 0 is a graduate abstract algebra textbook written by Paolo Aluffi. The book was first published in 2009 by the American Mathematical Society and is now a common choice in introductory courses in abstract algebra.

== History ==
Algebra: Chapter 0 was published by the American Mathematical Society's as part of their Graduate Studies in Mathematics series. The book was well-received and an updated second printing was published in 2016.

The book began as a transcript of Aluffi's lectures at Florida State University.

Aluffi maintains an extensive list of errata on his Florida State University webpage.

== Content ==
The book aims to be a fully self-contained introduction to abstract algebra for advanced undergraduates and beginning graduates. The main distinguishing factor of the book from other algebra texts is its early introduction to categories which remain relevant throughout the book. It also features a greater emphasis on homological algebra.
