= Algorithms Unlocked =

- Cover of Algorithms Unlocked
- Author: Thomas H. Cormen
- Language: English
- Subject: Computer algorithms
- Publisher: MIT Press
- Publication date: 2013
- Publication place: United States
- Pages: 240
- ISBN: 978-0-262-51880-2

Algorithms Unlocked is a book by Thomas H. Cormen about the basic principles and applications of computer algorithms. The book consists of ten chapters, and deals with the topics of searching, sorting, basic graph algorithms, string processing, the fundamentals of cryptography and data compression, and an introduction to the theory of computation.
