= Paolo Aluffi =

Italian-American mathematician

- Born: June 14, 1960 (age 66); Turin, Italy
- Known for: Algebra: Chapter 0

Academic background
- Education: Brown University
- Thesis: On Some Characteristic Numbers for Smooth Plane Curves (1987)
- Doctoral advisor: William Fulton

Academic work
- Discipline: Mathematics
- Sub-discipline: Algebraic geometry
- Institutions: University of Chicago (1987-9); Oklahoma State University (1989-91); Florida State University (1991-present)
- Website: www.math.fsu.edu/~aluffi/

Paolo Aluffi is an Italian-American mathematician specializing in algebraic geometry who is known for his book Algebra: Chapter 0. His research primarily focuses on characteristic classes. Throughout his career Aluffi has received funding from the Simons Foundation, the National Security Agency, and the National Science Foundation. He is currently a distinguished research professor at Florida State University and serves as one of the managing editors for the Journal of Singularities.

== Education ==
In 1983, Aluffi received his laurea in mathematics from the University of Turin in Italy, mentored by Alberto Collino. Four years later he completed his Ph.D. at Brown University. His dissertation, On Some Characteristic Numbers for Smooth Plane Curves, was written under the supervision of William Fulton.

== Career ==
With the completion of his Ph.D. in 1987, Aluffi spent two years as a Dickson Instructor at the University of Chicago followed by another two years as a visiting assistant professor at Oklahoma State University. He moved to Florida State University as an assistant professor in 1991 where he became a full professor by 2000. Since 2009 he has also held a visiting position at Caltech. In 2024 he was named a Distinguished Research Professor at Florida State University.

At Florida State University Aluffi wrote Algebra: Chapter 0, a graduate-level abstract algebra textbook published by the American Mathematical Society. The book is an edited compilation of transcripts from his abstract algebra lectures. It received positive reviews and is the textbook of choice for a number of universities. In 2021, Aluffi published another abstract algebra book aimed at undergraduate students, titled Algebra - Notes from the Underground. What separates Aluffi's books from most abstract algebra texts is the ordering of the material. In Chapter 0, Aluffi introduces categories and universal properties at the outset. In Notes from the Underground, he takes a modern "ring-first" approach as opposed to the standard "group-first" approach. The idea is that someone with no knowledge of abstract algebra will find it easier to learn about rings as they are already comfortable with the ring of integers.

== Research ==
Aluffi’s research is in algebraic geometry. Most of it deals with enumerative geometry and with singularity theory, specifically characteristic classes for singular varieties. He has also worked on questions in algebraic geometry motivated by connections with high energy physics. His collaborators include Carel Faber, Matilde Marcolli, and Jonathan Mboyo Esole.

== Selected publications ==
- Aluffi, Paolo (2009). Algebra: Chapter 0. Providence, R.I: American Mathematical Society. ISBN 978-0-8218-4781-7.
- Aluffi, Paolo (2021). Algebra: Notes from the Underground. Cambridge: Cambridge University Press. ISBN 9781108958233.
- Aluffi, Paolo (1999). "Chern classes for singular hypersurfaces". Transactions of the American Mathematical Society. 351 (10): 3989–4026. arXiv:alg-geom/9607011. doi:10.1090/S0002-9947-99-02256-4. ISSN 0002-9947.
- Aluffi, Paolo; Faber, Carel (2000). "Linear orbits of arbitrary plane curves". Michigan Math. J. 48 (1): 1–37. arXiv:math/9912092. doi:10.1307/mmj/1030132706.
- Aluffi, Paolo; Marcolli, Matilde (2009). "Feynman motives of banana graphs". Commun. Number Theory Phys. 3 (1): 1–57. arXiv:0807.1690. doi:10.4310/CNTP.2009.v3.n1.a1.
- Aluffi, Paolo; Mihalcea, Leonardo; Schürmann, Jörg; Su, Changjian (2023). "Shadows of characteristic cycles, Verma modules, and positivity of Chern-Schwartz-MacPherson classes of Schubert cells". Duke Mathematical Journal. 172 (17): 3257–3320. arXiv:1709.08697. doi:10.1215/00127094-2022-0101.
