= Maxime Crochemore =

French computer scientist

- Born: October 25, 1947 (age 78); Fécamp, France
- Citizenship: France
- Education: University of Rouen
- Scientific career
- Fields: String algorithms, automata theory
- Workplaces: King's College London; Paris Diderot University; University of Marne-la-Vallée; Paris 13 University
- Doctoral advisor: Dominique Perrin
- Doctoral students: Marie-France Sagot

Maxime Crochemore (born 1947) is a French computer scientist known for his numerous contributions to algorithms on strings. He is currently a professor at King's College London.

== Biography ==
Crochemore earned his doctorate (PhD) in 1978 and his Doctorat d'état (DSc) in 1983 from the University of Rouen. He was a professor at Paris 13 University in 1985–1989, and moved to a professorship at Paris Diderot University in 1989. In 2002–2007, Crochemore was a senior research fellow at King's College London, where he is a professor since 2007. Since 2007, he is also a professor emeritus at the University of Marne-la-Vallée.

Crochemore holds an honorary doctorate (2014) from the University of Helsinki. A festschrift in his honour was published in 2009 as a special issue of Theoretical Computer Science.

== Research contributions ==
Crochemore published over 100 journal papers on string algorithms. He in particular introduced new algorithms for pattern matching, string indexing and text compression. His work received a significant number of academic citations.

Crochemore has co-authored three well-known scientific monographs on the design of algorithms for string processing: "Text Algorithms" (1994; jointly with Wojciech Rytter), "Jewels of Stringology" (2002, jointly with Wojciech Rytter), and "Algorithms on Strings" (2007, jointly with Christophe Hancart and Thierry Lecroq).
