= Wojciech Rytter =

Wojciech Rytter is a Polish computer scientist, a professor of computer science in the automata theory group at the University of Warsaw. His research focuses on the design and analysis of algorithms, and in particular on stringology, the study of algorithms for searching and manipulating text.

== Professional career ==
Rytter earned a master's degree in 1971 and a Ph.D. in 1975 from Warsaw University, and earned his habilitation in 1985. He has been on the faculty of Warsaw University since 1971, and is now a full professor there. He has also held long-term visiting positions at the New Jersey Institute of Technology, Liverpool University, Bonn University, the University of California, Riverside, Warwick University, and the University of Mexico.

== Books ==
Rytter is the author or co-author of:

- Zagadnienie stabilności automatów skończonych Stochastycznych (in Polish, PKiN, 1972)
- Automaty funkcyjne (in Polish, Centrum Obliczeniowe Polskiej Akademii Nauk, 1976)
- Złożność czasowa dwukierunkowych automatów stosowych i programów rekurencyjnych (in Polish, 1983)
- Efficient parallel algorithms (with Alan Gibbons, Cambridge University Press, 1988)
- Analysis of algorithms and data structures (with Lech Banachowski and Antoni Kreczmar, Addison-Wesley, 1991)
- Text algorithms (with Maxime Crochemore, Oxford University Press, 1994)
- Fast parallel algorithms for graph matching problems (with Marek Karpinski, Clarendon Press, 1998)
- Jewels of stringology: text algorithms (with Maxime Crochemore, World Scientific, 2002)

== Awards and honors ==
Rytter is a member of the Academia Europaea.
