= The Beauty of Fractals =

Book by Heinz-Otto Peitgen

- Cover
- Author: Heinz-Otto Peitgen, Peter Richter
- Subject: Fractals
- Publisher: Springer-Verlag, Heidelberg
- Publication date: 1986
- ISBN: 0-387-15851-0
- OCLC: 13331323
- Dewey Decimal: 516 19
- LC Class: QA447 .P45 1986
- Followed by: The Science of Fractal Images

The Beauty of Fractals is a 1986 book by Heinz-Otto Peitgen and Peter Richter which publicises the fields of complex dynamics, chaos theory and the concept of fractals. It is lavishly illustrated and as a mathematics book became an unusual success.

The book includes a total of 184 illustrations, including 88 full-colour pictures of Julia sets. Although the format suggests a coffee table book, the discussion of the background of the presented images addresses some sophisticated mathematics which would not be found in popular science books. In 1987 the book won an Award for distinguished technical communication.

== Summary ==
The book starts with a general introduction to Complex Dynamics, Chaos and fractals. In particular the Feigenbaum scenario and the relation to Julia sets and the Mandelbrot set is discussed. The following special sections provide in depth detail for the shown images: Verhulst Dynamics, Julia Sets and Their Computergraphical Generation, Sullivan's Classification of Critical Points, The Mandelbrot Set, External Angles and Hubbard Trees, Newton's Method for Complex Polynomials: Cayley's Problem, Newtons's Method for Real Equations, A Discrete Volterra-Lotka System, Yang-Lee Zeros, Renormalization (Magnetism and Complex Boundaries).

The book also includes invited Contributions by Benoît Mandelbrot, Adrien Douady, Gert Eilenberger and Herbert W. Franke, which provide additional formality and some historically interesting detail. Benoit Mandelbrot gives a very personal account of his discovery of fractals in general and the fractal named after him in particular. Adrien Douady explains the solved and unsolved problems relating to the almost amusingly complex Mandelbrot set.

== The images ==
Part of the text was originally conceived as a supplemented catalogue to the exhibition Frontiers of Chaos of the German Goethe-Institut, first seen in Europe and the United States. It described the context and meaning of these images. The images were created at the "Computer Graphics Laboratory Dynamical Systems" at the University of Bremen in 1984 and 1985. Dedicated software had to be developed to make the necessary computations which at that time took hours of computer time to create a single image. For the exhibit and the book the computed images had to be captured as photographs. Digital image capturing and archiving were not feasible at that time.

The book was cited and its images were reproduced in a number of publications. Some images were even used before the book was published. The cover article of the Scientific American August 1985 edition showed some of the images and provided reference to the book to be published.

One particular image sequence of the book is the close up series "seahorse valley". While the first publication of such a close up series was the June 1984 cover article of the Magazine Geo, The Beauty of Fractals provided the first such publication within a book.

== Translations ==
- Italian translation: La Bellezza dei Frattali, Bollati Boringhieri, Torino 1987, ISBN 88-339-0420-2
- Japanese translation: Springer-Verlag, Tokyo 1988, ISBN 3-540-15851-0
- Russian translation: Krasota Fractalov, Mir, Moscow 1993, ISBN 5-03-001296-6
- Chinese translation: Z.-J. Jing and X.-S. Zhang, Science Publishers, Beijing 1994, ISBN 7-03-004188-7/TP 374
