= Susana Vinga =

Portuguese researcher and computational biologist

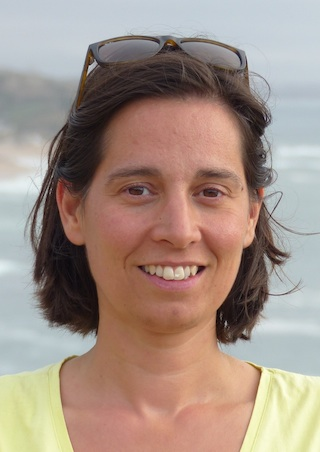
- Born: Lisbon, Portugal
- Education: ITQB/Univ. Nova de Lisboa Instituto Superior Técnico
- Awards: Olimpíadas Portuguesas de Matemática (1989) Young Research Award of the Technical University of Lisbon (2010) Prémio Científico da Universidade de Lisboa/CGD in the area of Computer Science and Engineering (2017 and 2022)
- Scientific career
- Fields: Computational Biology, Mathematics
- Workplaces: INESC-ID, Instituto Superior Técnico
- Website: https://sels.tecnico.ulisboa.pt/

Susana Vinga is currently associate professor at Instituto Superior Técnico/Universidade de Lisboa (IST/ULisboa) at the Dept. of Computer Science and Engineering (DEI) and the Dept. of Bioengineering (DBE). She is a Senior Researcher at INESC-ID in the Information and Decision Support Systems lab. She received a degree in Mechanical Engineering from Instituto Superior Técnico (1999) and a PhD in Biology/Bioinformatics at ITQB/Univ. Nova de Lisboa (2005). Before this position, she was Principal Investigator (Investigador FCT) at IDMEC. Susana was part of the Board of Directors at INESC-ID between 2021 and 2023 and is a Senior Editorial Board Member of BMC Bioinformatics, a top journal in Mathematical and Computational Biology, PLoS ONE, and Genes.

She has successfully coordinated as Principal Investigator several national projects and participated in several national and European projects as a team member and work package leader in the areas of Biotechnology and Computational Biology. Since January 2021, she is the PI of the European H2020 Twinning project OLISSIPO - Fostering Computational Biology Research and Innovation in Lisbon, which aims to strengthen INESC-ID/IST research profile in Computational Biology. By promoting several training activities in this area, OLISSIPO contributed to leverage the skills of Early-Stage Researchers in Portugal and around Europe.

== Publications ==
She has published in high-impact journals, achieving a Google h-index=29 with more than 4355 citations. Among main achievements in the development of methods for Genomics, she coined the area of alignment-free biological sequence analysis and comparison in a review, which is one of the most cited paper in Portugal in Computer Science. Susana wrote a book chapter on Biological sequence analysis by vector-valued functions.

In 2021, she integrated the Stanford’s list of the World’s top 2% most-cited researchers in 2021 via Elsevier. The same achievement was repeated in 2023.

== Awards ==
In 2010, she was granted the Young Research Award of the Technical University of Lisbon, and in 2017 and 2022, she was awarded the Scientific Award from Universidade de Lisboa/CGD in the area of Computer Science and Engineering for the impact of her publications.
