= Thomas H. Cormen =

American politician and academic

- Born: 1956 (age 69–70); New York City, U.S.
- Education: Massachusetts Institute of Technology; Princeton University
- Scientific career
- Fields: Computer Science
- Workplaces: Dartmouth College
- Doctoral advisor: Charles E. Leiserson

Member of the New Hampshire House of Representatives from the Grafton 15 district
- Incumbent
- Assumed office December 7, 2022
- Succeeded by: Zoe Hill (elect)

Personal details
- Party: Democratic

Thomas H. Cormen is an American politician and retired academic. He is the co-author of Introduction to Algorithms, along with Charles Leiserson, Ron Rivest, and Cliff Stein. In 2013, he published a new book titled Algorithms Unlocked. He is an emeritus professor of computer science at Dartmouth College and former chairman of the Dartmouth College Department of Computer Science. Between 2004 and 2008 he directed the Dartmouth College Writing Program. His research interests are algorithm engineering, parallel computing, and speeding up computations with high latency. In 2022, he was elected as a Democratic member of the New Hampshire House of Representatives.

== Early life and education ==
Thomas H. Cormen was born in New York City in 1956. He grew up in Oceanside, New York.

He received his bachelor's degree summa cum laude in Electrical Engineering and Computer Science from Princeton University in June 1978.

He then went to the Massachusetts Institute of Technology, where he earned his master's degree in Electrical Engineering and Computer Science in May 1986 with a thesis on "Concentrator Switches for Routing Messages in Parallel Computers" and his PhD with a thesis on "Virtual Memory for Data-Parallel Computing" in February 1993.

From July 2004 through June 2008, he was the director of the Dartmouth Institute for Writing and Rhetoric.

== Honors and awards ==
During his career he received several honors and awards:

- Elected to Phi Beta Kappa, Tau Beta Pi, Eta Kappa Nu.
- National Science Foundation Fellowship.
- Best Presentation Award, 1986 International Conference on Parallel Processing, St. Charles, Illinois.
- Distinguished Presentation Award, 1987 International Conference on Parallel Processing, St. Charles, Illinois.
- Professional and Scholarly Publishing Award in Computer Science and Data Processing, Association of American Publishers, 1990.
- Dartmouth College Class of 1962 Faculty Fellowship, 1995–1996.
- Jacobus Family Fellow, Dartmouth College, 1998–1999.
- McLane Family Fellow, Dartmouth College, 2004–2005.

== Bibliography ==
- Cormen, Thomas H.; Leiserson, Charles E.; Rivest, Ronald L. (1990). Introduction to Algorithms (first ed.). MIT Press and McGraw-Hill. ISBN 978-0-262-03141-7.
- Cormen, Thomas H. (2002). Algorithmic Complexity. CRC Press.
- Cormen, Thomas H.; Leiserson, Charles E.; Rivest, Ronald L.; Stein, Clifford (2001). Introduction to Algorithms (second ed.). MIT Press and McGraw-Hill. ISBN 978-0-262-53196-2.
- Cormen, Thomas H.; Clara Lee; Erica Lin (2002). Instructor's Manual to Accompany Introduction to Algorithms, Second Edition (second ed.). MIT Press.
- Cormen, Thomas H.; Leiserson, Charles E.; Rivest, Ronald L.; Stein, Clifford (2009). Introduction to Algorithms (third ed.). MIT Press. ISBN 978-0-262-03384-8.
- Cormen, Thomas H. (2009). Instructor's Manual to Accompany Introduction to Algorithms, Third edition (third ed.). MIT Press.
- Cormen, Thomas H. (2013). Algorithms Unlocked (first ed.). MIT Press. ISBN 978-0-262-51880-2.
- Cormen, Thomas H.; Leiserson, Charles E.; Rivest, Ronald L.; Stein, Clifford (2022). Introduction to Algorithms (fourth ed.). MIT Press. ISBN 978-0-262-04630-5.
