= Clifford Stein =

American computer scientist (born 1965)

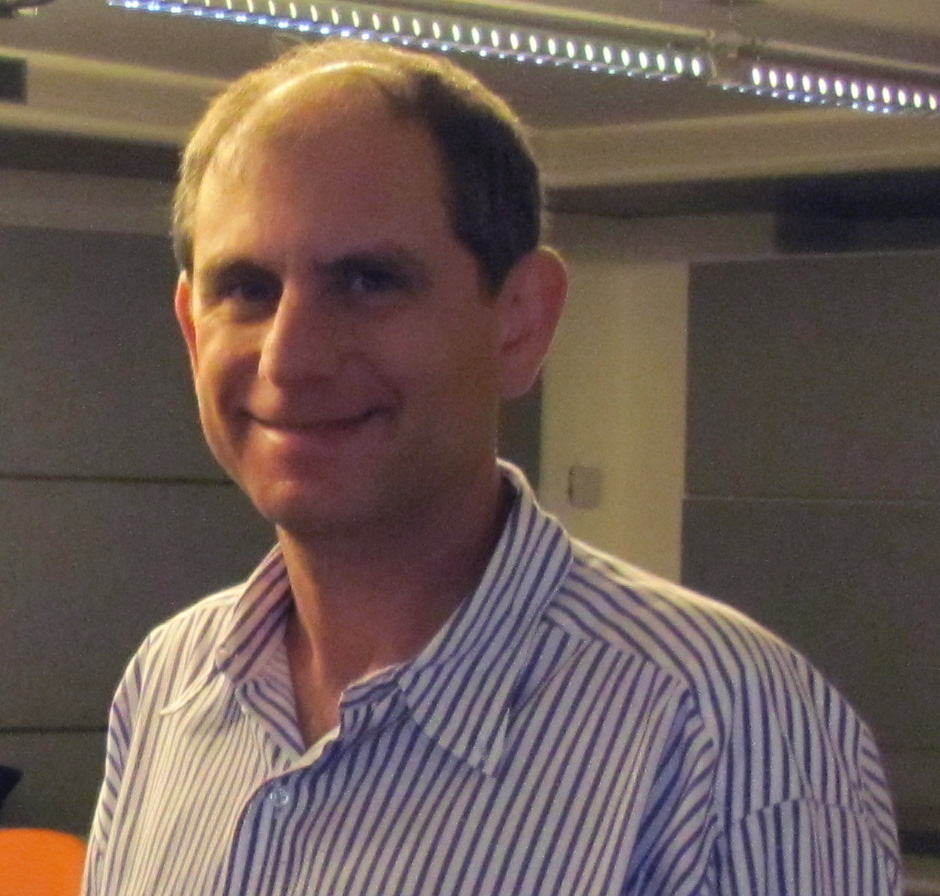
- Born: Clifford Seth Stein; December 14, 1965 (age 60)
- Education: Massachusetts Institute of Technology; Princeton University
- Scientific career
- Fields: Computer Science
- Workplaces: Columbia University; Dartmouth College
- Thesis: Approximation Algorithms for Multicommodity Flow and Shop Scheduling Problems (1992)
- Doctoral advisor: David Shmoys

Clifford Seth Stein (born December 14, 1965), a computer scientist, is a professor of industrial engineering and operations research at Columbia University in New York, NY, where he also holds an appointment in the Department of Computer Science. Stein is chair of the Industrial Engineering and Operations Research Department at Columbia University. Prior to joining Columbia, Stein was a professor at Dartmouth College in New Hampshire.

Stein's research interests include the design and analysis of algorithms, combinatorial optimization, operations research, network algorithms, scheduling, algorithm engineering and computational biology.

Stein has published many influential papers in the leading conferences and journals in his fields of research, and has occupied a variety of editorial positions including in the journals ACM Transactions on Algorithms, Mathematical Programming, Journal of Algorithms, SIAM Journal on Discrete Mathematics and Operations Research Letters. His work has been funded by the National Science Foundation and the Sloan Foundation. As of September 29, 2024, his publications have been cited over 87,000 times, and he has an h-index of 58.

Stein is the winner of several prestigious awards including an NSF Career Award, an Alfred Sloan Research Fellowship and the Karen Wetterhahn Award for Distinguished Creative or Scholarly Achievement. He is also the co-author of two textbooks:

- Introduction to Algorithms, with T. Cormen, C. Leiserson and R. Rivest, which is currently the best-selling textbook in algorithms and has been translated into 8 languages. About 74,000 of Stein's 87,000 citations are made to this book.
- Discrete Mathematics for Computer Science, with Ken Bogart and Scot Drysdale, which is a new textbook that covers discrete math at an undergraduate level.

Stein earned his B.S.E. from Princeton University in 1987, a Master of Science from The Massachusetts Institute of Technology in 1989, and a PhD also from the Massachusetts Institute of Technology in 1992.

== Bibliography ==
- Cormen, Thomas H.; Leiserson, Charles E.; Rivest, Ronald L.; Stein, Clifford (2001). Introduction to Algorithms (second ed.). MIT Press and McGraw-Hill. ISBN 0-262-53196-8.
