= Warp drive (disambiguation) =

Warp drive is a fictitious spacecraft propulsion system in many science fiction works.

Warp drive or Warp Drive may also refer to:

- Warp Drive, a short street in Sterling, Virginia, US
- Warp Drive Inc, an American manufacturer of composite propellers for ultralight aircraft

== See also ==
- Alcubierre warp drive, a speculative idea for faster-than-light travel
- Warp (disambiguation)
