= Warp zone (disambiguation) =

Warp zone may refer to:

- Warp (video games), a specific area that allow travel between two locations or levels in video games
- Warp Zone (album), a 2000 album by Martyr
- "The Warpzone", a song by Basshunter from The Bassmachine

== See also ==
- Warp (disambiguation)
- The Warp (disambiguation)
