= MISD =

MISD may refer to:

- Independent School Districts in Texas - M
- Marion Independent School District (Iowa)
- Macomb Intermediate School District
- Multiple instruction, single data, a parallel computing architecture
- Misdemeanor, a criminal offense that is less serious than a felony
- Mansfield Independent School District
