= Warp and weft (disambiguation) =

Warp and weft are the components of weaving to turn thread into cloth.

Warp and weft or variations, may also refer to:

- Warp & Weft, a 2013 album by Laura Veirs
- "The Warp and the Weft", a 2018 song by Lotic from their album Power
- Warp & Weft, a 2004 novel by Edward J. Delaney
- Warp & Weft: A Dictionary of Textile Terms, a 1981 work by Dorothy K. Burnham
- The Warp & Weft, an online audio archive curated by artist Mara Ahmed
- "Warp and Weft", a 1999 article by surgeon and writer Lori Alvord

== See also ==
- Knot density = warp × weft
- Knot ratio = warp / weft
- Weft (disambiguation)
- Warp (disambiguation)
