= Weft (disambiguation) =

Weft is a basic component in weaving, used to turn thread into cloth, along with warp.

Weft or variant, may also refer to:

- Weft knitting, a major form of knitting
- Weft fern (Crepidomanes intricatum)
- WEFT (90.1 MHz), community radio station in Champaign, Illinois, USA
- War Eagle Flying Team (WEFT), Auburn University, Auburn, Alabama, USA
- Microsoft Web Embedding Fonts Tool (MS WEFT)

== See also ==
- Warp (disambiguation)
- Warp and weft (disambiguation)
