= Brad Karp =

Brad Karp may refer to:

- Brad Nelson Karp, American computer scientist
- Brad S. Karp (born 1959), American lawyer
