= The Warp =

The Warp may refer to:

- The Warp (Warhammer), a concept of a different timespace in the fictional Warhammer universe
- The Warp (play), a ten-cycle play by Neil Oram

== See also ==
- Warp (disambiguation)
