= Warping (sailing) =

Sailing maneuver

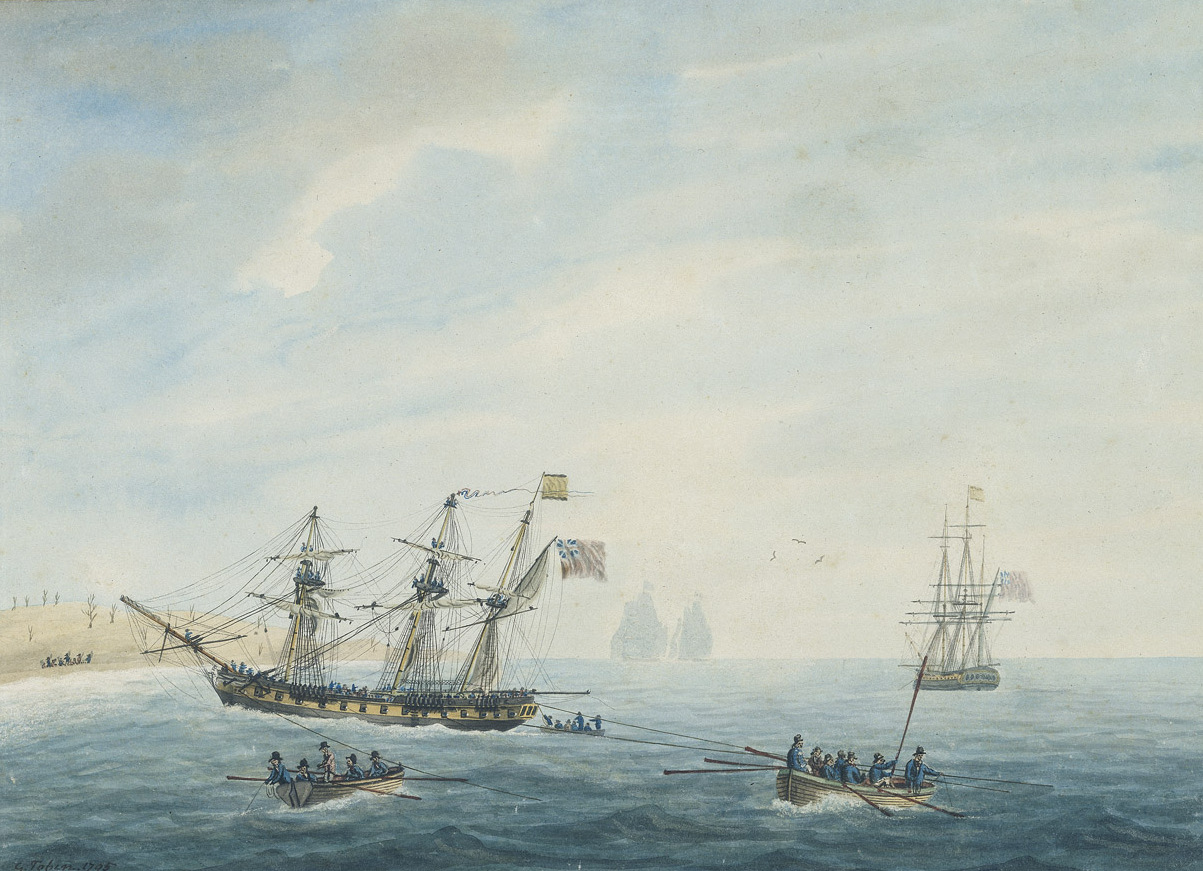
HMS Thetis run aground in North Carolina, 1794

Warping or kedging is a method of moving a sailing vessel, typically against the wind or current, after running aground, or out from a dead calm, by hauling on a line attached to a kedge anchor, a sea anchor, or a fixed object, such as a bollard or tree. In small boats, the anchor may be thrown in the intended direction of progress and hauled in after it settles, thus pulling the boat in that direction, while larger ships can use a small boat to carry the anchor ahead, drop it, and then haul. For example, the sloop Adventure under the command of the infamous pirate Blackbeard ran aground attempting to kedge the Queen Anne's Revenge off the bar near Beaufort Inlet, North Carolina, in June 1718.

== See also ==
- Careening
- Warp (disambiguation)
