= Financial Services Information Sharing and Analysis Center =

Cyber-risk prevention industry consortium

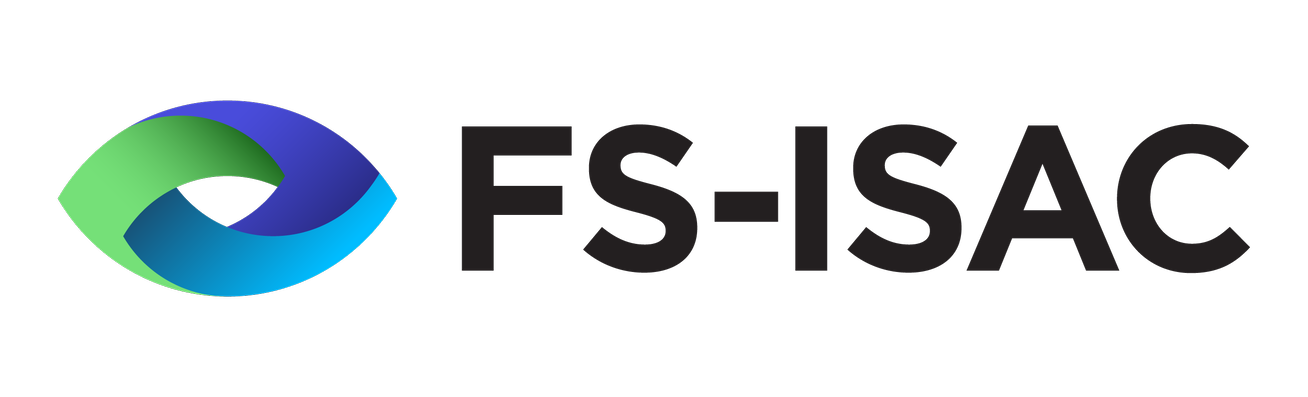
- Trade name: FS-ISAC
- Type: Information Sharing and Analysis Center
- Industry: Financial services
- Founded: 1999
- Members: Over 5,000
- Website: www.fsisac.com

The Financial Services Information Sharing and Analysis Center (FS-ISAC) is an industry consortium dedicated to reducing cyber-risk in the global financial system. Serving financial institutions and in turn their customers, the organization leverages its intelligence platform, resiliency resources, and a trusted peer-to-peer network of experts to anticipate, respond to, and mitigate cyberthreats. FS-ISAC has over 5,000-member firms with users in 75 countries. Headquartered in the United States, the organization has offices in The Hague, London, and Singapore.

== History ==
FS-ISAC was formed in 1999 in response to the Presidential Decision Directive 63, signed by President Clinton in 1998 which mandated that public and private sectors share information about physical and cybersecurity threats and vulnerabilities to help protect the US critical infrastructure via Information Sharing and Analysis Centers (ISACs). After the 9/11 attacks and in response to subsequent federal actions, FS-ISAC expanded its role to encompass physical threats to the financial sector. In recent years FS-ISAC has expanded into a global organization and has played a paramount role in leading several industry initiatives to better protect and serve the global financial services industry.
