= Cultural influence of Star Trek =

Star Trek influence on modern society

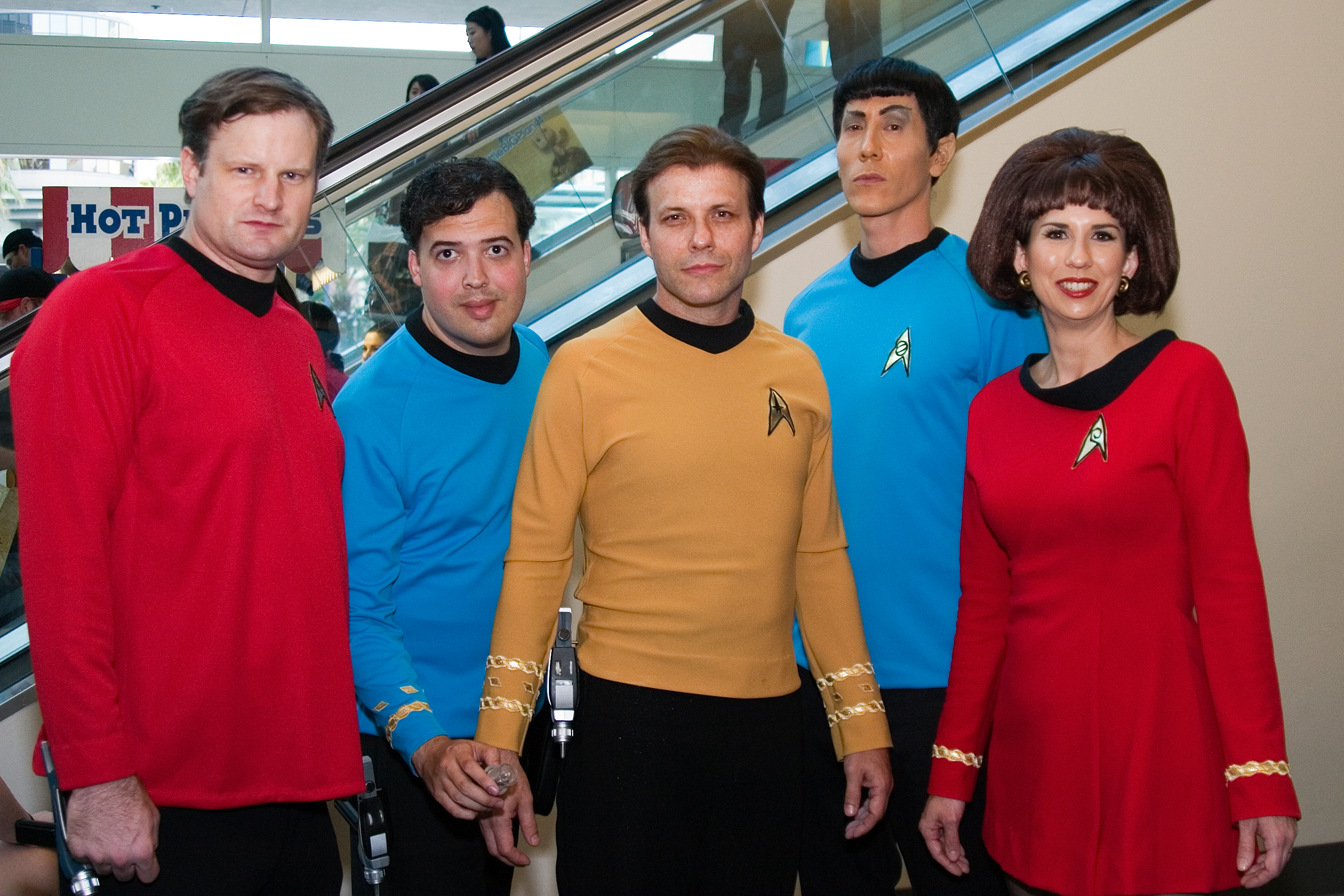
A group photo of people costumed as Star Trek characters at San Diego Comic-Con 2008

The science fiction multimedia franchise of Star Trek since its original debut in 1966 has been one of the most successful television series in science fiction television history and has had a large influence in popular culture as a result.

The original series, which aired in the late 1960s, has since spawned eleven successor series and fourteen movies as of October 2025, merchandise, and a multibillion-dollar industry collectively known as the Star Trek franchise. The franchise is owned by CBS Studios, which currently owns television properties previously held by Paramount Pictures, the studio that produced Star Trek for many decades. Paramount Global continues to hold DVD rights to the television series, and the rights to produce feature films.

Two films, Galaxy Quest (1999) and Free Enterprise (1999), and a television series, The Orville, have been inspired by the cultural influence of Star Trek.

== Star Trek: The Original Series ==
The fact is, never in the history of any entertainment medium has there ever been a story, an idea, a situation, a set of characters, or a theme that has approached the magnitude or impact of Star Trek.

— A Vision of the Future (1998)

Gene Roddenberry sold Star Trek in 1964 to NBC as a classic adventure drama, calling it a "Wagon Train to the Stars". But Roddenberry wanted to tell more sophisticated stories, using futuristic situations as analogies for current problems on Earth and showing how they could be rectified through humanism and optimism. The series' writers frequently addressed moral and social issues such as slavery, warfare, and discrimination. The opening line "to boldly go where no man has gone before" is almost verbatim from a US White House booklet on space produced after the flight of Sputnik 1 in October 1957.

A major inspiration for Star Trek was the science fiction film Forbidden Planet (1956), whose influence is especially apparent in the pilot episode "The Cage". Previous sophisticated science fiction television series included anthology series such as The Twilight Zone and the British Quatermass serials, but Star Trek was the first American science fiction series with a continuing cast that was aimed at adults, telling modern morality tales with complex narratives.

Earlier British science fiction series with marionettes and soap operas had interracial casting, but this was the first American live-action series to do this. At a time when there were few non-white or foreign roles in American television dramas, Roddenberry created a multi-ethnic crew for the Enterprise, including an African woman (Uhura), a Scotsman (Montgomery Scott), an Asian man (Hikaru Sulu), and an alien, the half-Vulcan Spock. In the second season, reflecting the contemporaneous Cold War, Roddenberry added a Russian crew member, Pavel Chekov (played by Walter Koenig). The original series is also credited with American television's first interracial kiss, between a white man and an African-American woman, although this had happened earlier in a British medical soap opera, Emergency Ward 10. Also, the spy series I Spy featured a scripted, unedited interracial kiss between Robert Culp (white) and France Nuyen (Vietnamese) in the episode "The Tiger"; a kiss that would not gain the controversy or attention as the Star Trek kiss did.

Star Trek's contributions to television history include giving women jobs of respect, most notably through the casting of Nichelle Nichols, a black actress, as Uhura, the ship's communications officer. Black actresses at that time on television were almost always cast as servants. In fact, Whoopi Goldberg recalled that the first time she saw Uhura, she excitedly told her mother: "there's a black lady on television and she ain't no maid!" In an interview, Nichols said that the day after she told Roddenberry she planned to leave the show, she was at a fund-raiser at the NAACP and was told there was a big fan who wanted to meet her. Nichols said,

I thought it was a Trekkie, and so I said, 'Sure.' I looked across the room, and there was Dr. Martin Luther King walking towards me with this big grin on his face. He reached out to me and said, 'Yes, Ms. Nichols, I am your greatest fan.' He said that Star Trek was the only show that he, and his wife Coretta, would allow their three little children to stay up and watch. [She told King about her plans to leave the series.] I never got to tell him why, because he said, 'You can't. You're part of history.'

When she told Roddenberry what King had said, he cried.

The Original Series has later received some criticism for its portrayal of women, particularly its visual aesthetics. Women's crew uniforms, which consisted of miniskirts, high heeled boots, and heavy makeup, have been pointed-to as degrading to women for highlighting their frequent role as sexual objects. Researchers have pointed out that this was not necessarily the way the wardrobe, or the overall femininity of female characters in the series, was viewed by contemporary female viewers. Cited are the concerns of women of the time period with the perceived upsetting of traditional gender roles for women of the future, with the women of the show's feminine behavior acting to reaffirm that women's sexuality and traditional femininity would not be lost. This fear was manifested by the media's criticisms of Valentina Tereshkova, the first female astronaut to go to space, as masculine and "mannish". The uniform's usage of the miniskirt was also considered progressive by some at the time, as the miniskirt, at that time, was a symbol of the modern woman's economic and sexual independence.

Computer engineer and entrepreneur Steve Wozniak credited watching Star Trek and attending Star Trek conventions while in his youth as a source of inspiration for him co-founding Apple Inc. in 1976, which would later become the world's largest technology company by revenue and the world's third-largest mobile phone manufacturer.

The series gained multiple Emmy Award nominations during its run, but never won. Despite a restricted budget, the series' special effects were superior to contemporary television series, its stories were often written by prominent science fiction authors (though often re-written by the series' regular writers), and many of its production values—such as costuming and set design—were of high caliber for the series' low budget. Some of the production staff of The Outer Limits worked on Star Trek and often made creative re-use of props from the earlier series.

During its network run from 1966 to 1969, TOS ratings were mediocre. A letter-writing campaign by fans, unprecedented in size, contributed to NBC's decision to renew the series for a third season, but the network put the series in a disadvantageous timeslot, and TOS was finally canceled after its third season.

== Cancellation and aftermath ==
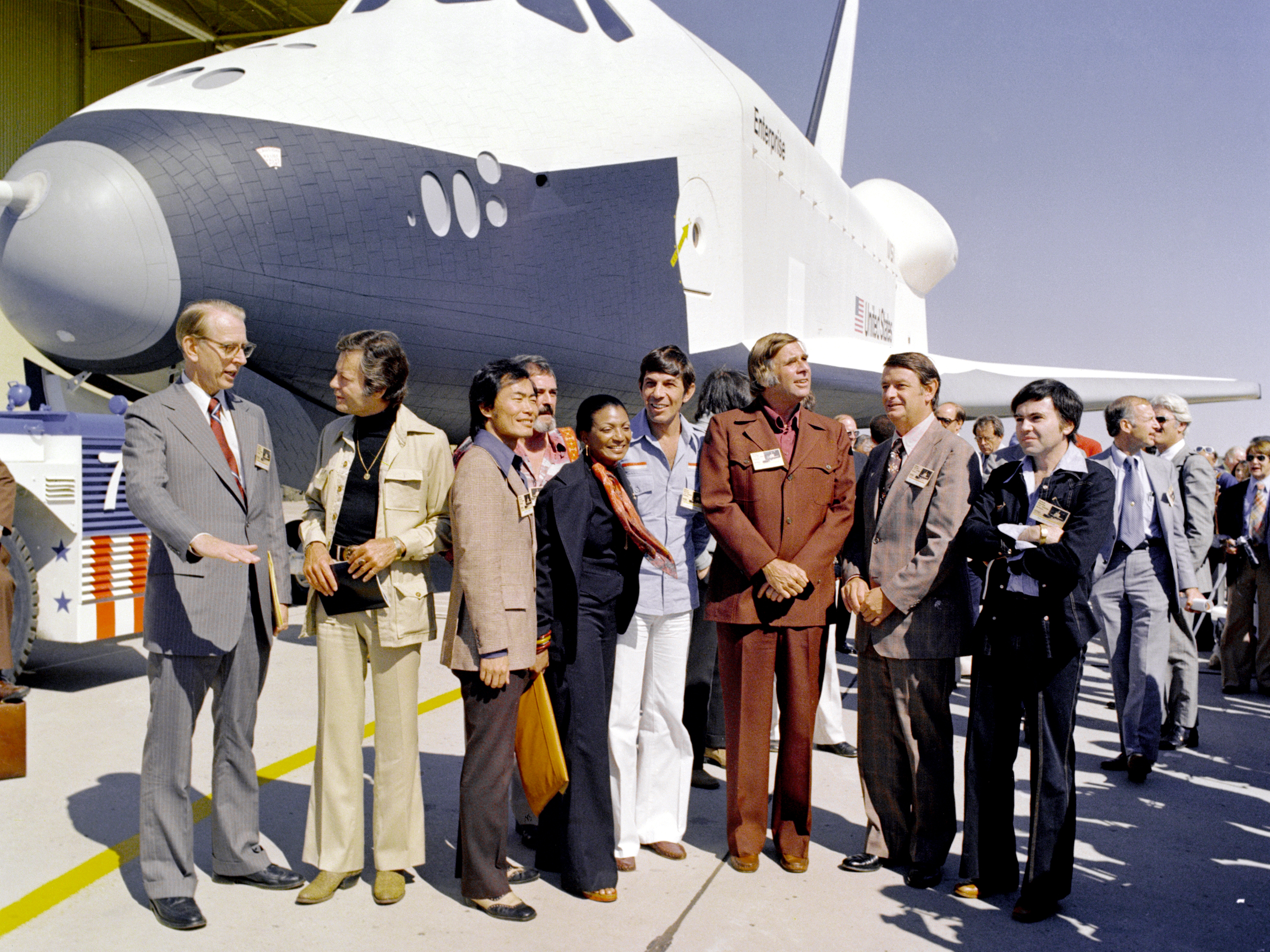
In 1976, a letter-writing campaign compelled NASA to name the inaugural (and test) Space Shuttle Enterprise after the fictional starship. In this image, the Enterprise is rolled out of the Palmdale manufacturing facilities with Star Trek television cast members and creator Gene Roddenberry in attendance.

After its cancellation, through reruns Star Trek became more popular and reached a much wider audience than when it had originally aired. Known as "trekkies" or "trekkers", the series' fans formed clubs and organized conventions. In 1976, following another fan-organized letter-writing campaign, NASA named its first Space Shuttle orbiter, Enterprise (OV-101), after the fictional starship.

After the series, Nichelle Nichols, who played Uhura, used her public standing to speak for women and people of colour and against their exclusion from the human space program of the United States. NASA reacted by asking her to find people for its future Space Shuttle program. Nichols proceeded and successfully brought the first people of colour and women into the US space program, working in this role for NASA from the late 1970s until the late 1980s.

== Film reception ==
In the mid-1970s, encouraged by the burgeoning fanbase for the series, Roddenberry sought to start a second television series (Star Trek: Phase II); this abortive attempt morphed into Star Trek: The Motion Picture in 1979. The movie did sufficiently well at the box office, grossing more than $80 million in the United States and $139 million worldwide, to spawn several more movies during the 1980s. In 1987, Roddenberry created a second television series, Star Trek: The Next Generation (TNG), which was set aboard the fifth starship USS Enterprise (NCC-1701-D) more than seventy years after events in the earlier series and related movies. Unlike TOS—which often reflected a bold, interventionist American philosophy—TNG had a less aggressive and more socially liberal message. Unlike its progenitor, this series entered syndicated, rather than a nationwide network, from the beginning, and was sold to individual local television stations. It became the number one syndicated television, lasting seven seasons, spawned two sequels, a prequel, four movies, and a vast marketing franchise.

Star Trek and its spin-offs have proved highly popular in television repeats, in the United States and through the world. The Star Trek franchise is similarly prolific. Only Star Wars has had as significant an influence as a science fiction and popular culture phenomenon. According to Forbes magazine, as of 2005:

- the five live-action Star Trek series to date had garnered 31 Emmy Awards and 140 nominations. At least nine specials have been produced
- the first eleven movies cumulatively grossed US$2.145 billion at the box office: the most successful movie was Star Trek (2009) grossing $385 million worldwide and after a combined nine nominations for four films, it was the first Star Trek film to win an Academy Award. Having been nominated in four categories, it received the award for Best Make-up
- at least 120 compact discs and 40 video games contained "Star Trek" in their titles; the CDs are mostly soundtracks and audiobooks but also Klingon language instruction
- about 70 million books were in print
- the franchise entailed a merchandising business with a total lifetime gross of about $4 billion from companies including the Mego Corporation, Playmates Toys, Hallmark Cards and Hasbro
- resorts included rides and attractions at Paramount-owned amusement parks as well as Star Trek: The Experience formerly at the Las Vegas Hilton

=== Odd-even curse ===
Fans commonly considered the films to follow a "curse" that even-numbered films were better than the odd-numbered films. This is partially borne out by review aggregator statistics. For example, prior to the release of the 13th film the odd-numbered entries averaged 57% on the review aggregation website Rotten Tomatoes while the even-numbered entries averaged 79%. However, this perceived difference in quality is not reflected in box-office performance with the odd and even numbered entries having a virtually identical attendance in the United States and Canada on average.

The 10th film, Star Trek: Nemesis, was considered the even film that defied the curse. Its failure, the subsequent success of the 11th and 13th films, and the respective mixed and negative reception of the 12th and 14th films were considered to have broken the trend, which has led some to claim that the Star Trek movie curse has been inverted. Some fans count the successful Galaxy Quest as the 10th film to keep the odd-even curse in order.

The curse has been mentioned often in popular culture. One of the best known examples occurred in a 1999 episode of the Channel 4 sitcom Spaced, where it was referenced by Tim Bisley, played by Simon Pegg; Pegg, quite conscious of the irony, played Scotty in the eleventh and subsequent films.

== Fandom ==
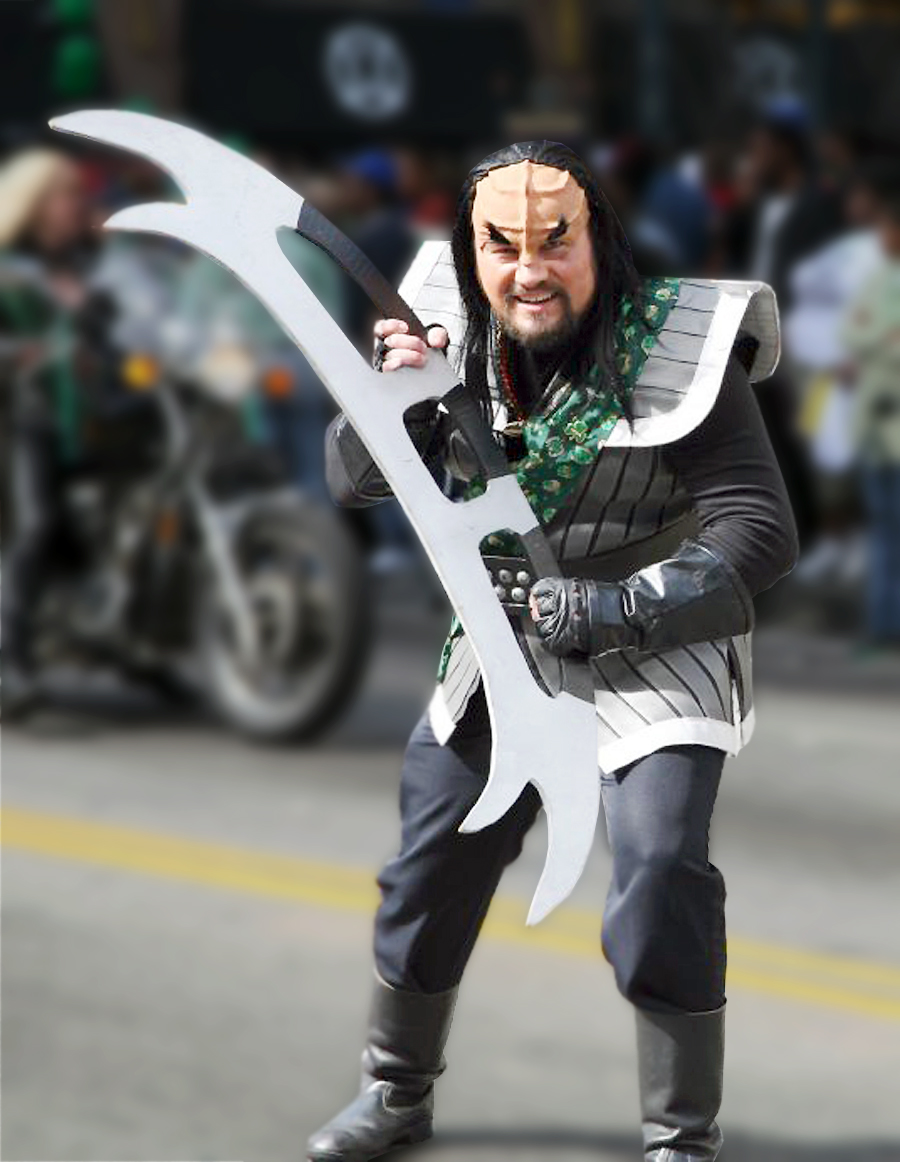
A cosplayer in a Klingon costume with a bat'leth

Star Trek conventions have been popular, and some are now meshed with conventions of other genres. Fans coined the terms "Trekkies" and "Trekkers" to describe themselves, and produce an abundance of material like fanzines with fiction, art and songs.

The series' cultural influence goes far beyond its longevity and profitability. An entire subculture grew up around the series and, anecdotally, there are indications that Star Trek has influenced many people's lives. Many scientists and engineers claim that their professional and life choices were influenced by Star Trek. An article in Columbia asserted that the starship captains of the Star Trek franchise are consistently among the best father figures on television, inspiring real fathers to embrace their responsibilities and act with "selfless authority". The inventor of the first non-vehicular cell phone, Martin Cooper, states he was motivated to develop it from watching Star Trek. Others have also been inspired by Star Trek when designing new technology, such as Dr. Peter Jansen, who invented a functional tricorder, and several computer scientists at the University of Illinois, who have created a prototypical version of Star Trek's famous Holodeck.

Some fans were drawn to a franchise that stood out for being unusually hopeful about the future, compared with most other works of science fiction. Rolling Stone credited its appeal to "sunny assurances": "Optimism. Respect for diversity. Faith that reason shall triumph over ignorance. Confidence that our destructive emotions can be mastered without denying us the benefits of more saintly ones like loyalty and love." Rejecting mainstream cynicism, the franchise presented the future Earth as a peaceful, egalitarian planet. The original series presented a utopian future for humanity, to the point that conflict and allegory often had to be inserted through encounters with less "enlightened" nonhuman races that stood in, from the series' perspective, as didactic proxies for disfavored aspects of 20th-century culture.

Some fans took the egalitarian nature of the show a step further. The unofficial homosexual pairing "Kirk/Spock" (or "K/S") slowly became popular within fan spaces, particularly with female fans. This led to the production of an abundance of fanworks centered around the pairing, including stories, poems, and art. Most widely believed to be the first K/S fan fiction is a 40-page privately-circulated novel written in 1968 by Jennifer Guttridge titled The Ring of Soshern, which was later printed in the highly controversial fanzine Alien Brothers without the author’s knowledge and soared in popularity and notoriety within the fandom. The genre of "slash fiction" is considered to have originated or at least been popularized by the K/S fanbase, with the "slash" in the pairing lending itself to the genre’s name. Over time, slash fiction has spread to other fandoms and remains popular in fan spaces to this day.

Well-known phrases like "Beam me up, Scotty", "Resistance is futile" (from the Borg), and Treknobabble have also managed to enter the English vernacular. Beyond this, "Trekkie" is the only fan label listed in the Oxford English Dictionary, and words from the series including Klingon have also been added to that dictionary.

Klingon has actually spawned a following of its own, going on to garner its own grammar and vocabulary and dedicated speakers from across the globe.

A broad consensus amongst fans is that the Star Trek franchise became formulaic and mediocre in the 1990s on account of over-exploitation of the franchise by Paramount and production of multiple spin-offs and movies, though fans do not necessarily agree as to when this began (some adult viewers of TOS felt it also could be formulaic and repetitive). The release in May 2009 of Star Trek, a reboot involving characters from the original series and set in an alternate timeline, was developed with the partial hope to resurrect the franchise.

Jeff Jensen of Entertainment Weekly, in reviewing the new film states that the Star Trek franchise had "devolved into a near-irrelevant cultural joke, likely to inspire giggles and unprintable curses from even its most ardent supporters." Leonard Nimoy wondered in 2003 whether or not the franchise "had run its course". Director J. J. Abrams said, "People [may not] even understand what Star Trek means anymore," and joked that a parody like Galaxy Quest which "mocks the paradigm" made the task of producing a credible Star Trek film that much more challenging. Even on set, Abrams felt nervous "with all these tattooed faces and pointy ears, bizarre weaponry and Romulan linguists, with dialogue about 'Neutral Zones' and 'Starfleet'". In covering the relaunch film, Jensen remarked the series' optimistic nature ran counter to an increasingly cynical culture, and that the film had been delayed from December 2008 to May 2009 to "rehab" the series' image.

Upon release, the film was a major critical and box office success, sparking comments by fans and critics that the franchise has a bright renewed future.

Star Trek is the only media franchise that's clearly referenced in the Unicode emoji standard. The 🖖 emoji has an American English short name of "vulcan salute".

"When I was in high school, I'd smoke a joint in my closet in Yonkers, New York, and watch Star Trek," recalled Aerosmith front-man Steven Tyler. "I knew Sulu. When Uhura said, 'Open all hailing frequencies,' I picked up my phone."

== The music of Star Trek ==
The opening fanfare of Star Trek: The Original Series, written by Alexander Courage, is a culturally-recognized musical memes in existence.

Also included as the opening fanfare to Star Trek: The Next Generation and the Star Trek film series, it has come to symbolize Star Trek. Michael Giacchino has written another fanfare for the reboot Star Trek movie and its sequels, Star Trek Into Darkness and Star Trek Beyond.

Star Trek: Voyager and Star Trek: Deep Space Nine received their own distinctive opening fanfares. In a departure from the tradition of sweeping classical themes symbolizing the various incarnations of Star Trek, the opening theme to Star Trek: Enterprise is the (pre-existing) pop song "Faith of the Heart", by Diane Warren (Star Trek: Enterprise episodes close with the orchestral "Archer's Theme" epilogue, a piece which is more similar to the preceding Star Trek themes than "Faith of the Heart").

Some of the most prominent composers of 20th- and 21st-century film music have written film scores and television scores for Star Trek. These include Jay Chattaway, Cliff Eidelman, Michael Giacchino, Jerry Goldsmith, James Horner, Dennis McCarthy and Leonard Rosenman.

A subgenre of Star Trek fandom has developed, specifically for the music of Star Trek, which includes music lovers who are not otherwise interested in Star Trek fandom. Dozens of commercially produced musical recordings of performances of Star Trek music exist—unrelated to the performance of screen Star Trek itself—evidencing the intrinsic cultural value and influence of the music of Star Trek.

A concert series, Star Trek: The Music, by Erich Kunzel and the Cincinnati Pops Orchestra, played in several American and Canadian cities between 2007 and 2010.

== Science fiction, fantasy and television ==
The first television series with comparable storyline and set-up to Star Trek (aside from the genre rival Doctor Who) was the 1990s series Babylon 5. When pitching the series, the producer J. Michael Straczynski had hoped that television executives would think Trek had opened up the market for science-fiction on television. However, he was told that Star Trek only created a market for more Star Trek and that the prospects for non-Trek related science fiction were seen as bleak. Eventually, Babylon 5 was greenlit. Three script writers who had worked for the original Trek series were to write for Babylon 5 (including D. C. Fontana who had written for three different Trek series), and Star Trek actor Walter Koenig was cast in a recurring role. All this, and the strong similarities of the series' premise to Star Trek: Deep Space Nine invited comparison to Star Trek. In addition, Babylon 5 was the first television series since Star Trek to get nominated for or win the Hugo award for best science fiction drama, which had only recognized feature films in the media category since Star Trek. Gene Roddenberry's widow and Star Trek actress, Majel Barrett-Roddenberry, publicly stated that her decision to do a guest star appearance on Babylon 5 was to stop the feuding and bickering among hardline fans of the two series, which broke out occasionally at science fiction conventions. Ultimately, the series ran for its intended length of five seasons, making it the longest running American space oriented futuristic television series outside of the Star Trek franchise.

=== Star Trek fandom in fiction ===
Some television series feature major or supporting characters whose love of Star Trek affects the storyline of the series.

In the Cold War submarine film Crimson Tide (1995), in a moment of crisis, the USS Alabama's executive officer (played by Denzel Washington) gives a pep talk to his young radioman, urging him to repair the ship's radio by referring to Captain Kirk telling Scotty they need "more power".

The romantic comedy Free Enterprise (1999) centers around the lives of two men (played by Eric McCormack and Rafer Weigel) who grew up worshipping Star Trek and emulating Captain Kirk. Most of the movie centers on William Shatner, playing a parody of himself, and how the characters wrestle with their relationships with Star Trek.

Over a dozen actors from various Star Trek series have made guest appearances on one or the other of the Stargate series. In those series, Colonel Jack O'Neill makes unsuccessful pitches to name new space vessels after the Enterprise, and also gives the Vulcan salute in tribute to Trek. In an earlier episode of Stargate: SG-1, O'Neill travels back in time to the 1960s and during an interrogation by an Air Force officer he refers to himself as "James T. Kirk, captain of the federation starship Enterprise". Another Trek reference is made when a character questions whether or not another team member can be "beamed up". The response is "What am I, Scotty"? Later on the series, advanced alien technology allows team members to "beam" up and down in manner similar to that seen on Star Trek.

"The Replacement", a season 5 episode of Buffy the Vampire Slayer, features two versions of the character Xander Harris. During development, the episode's writer was aware of the original series episode "The Enemy Within", in which there are two Captain Kirks.

The Trek fandom of Noel Shempsky, a recurring character on the sitcom Frasier, plays a role in several episodes, including "Star Mitzvah", in which he deceives Frasier Crane into believing a speech is written in Hebrew when it is really in the Klingon language.

In crossover casting, two other television series have cast actors from Star Trek in series in which other characters are Star Trek fans who frequently refer to Trek moments or cite Trek storylines. The character Hiro Nakamura on NBC's Heroes likes to describe his ability to teleport as "like Star Trek", and has often performed Mr. Spock's Vulcan salute. His father is played by George Takei, who played Hikaru Sulu on the original series. Additionally, Nichelle Nichols, who played Nyota Uhura on the original series also appears on the series.

The main characters from the sitcom The Big Bang Theory, especially Sheldon Cooper, make various references to and are huge fans of Star Trek, with Sheldon even citing Starfleet regulations during an argument in one episode and the main characters dressing up as Data, Worf, Captain Picard and a Borg drone, respectively, in another. Also the series features Wil Wheaton in a recurring role as a fictionalized version of himself plus guest appearances from Brent Spiner, LeVar Burton and William Shatner, and a voice-only cameo from Leonard Nimoy, who voices a Mr. Spock action figure talking to Sheldon in his dreams. There was also an appearance of a Gorn in one episode.

The Gorn captain's fight to the death with Captain Kirk in the original series episode, "Arena", was the subject of an episode of the television series MythBusters, in which the viability of Kirk's improvised bamboo cannon was put to the test.

The film Please Stand By (2017) centers around Wendy Welcott (played by Dakota Fanning), a huge fan of Star Trek with autism who writes a screenplay for a Star Trek film, intending to enter it into a script-writing competition sponsored by Paramount Pictures.

== Parodies and tributes ==
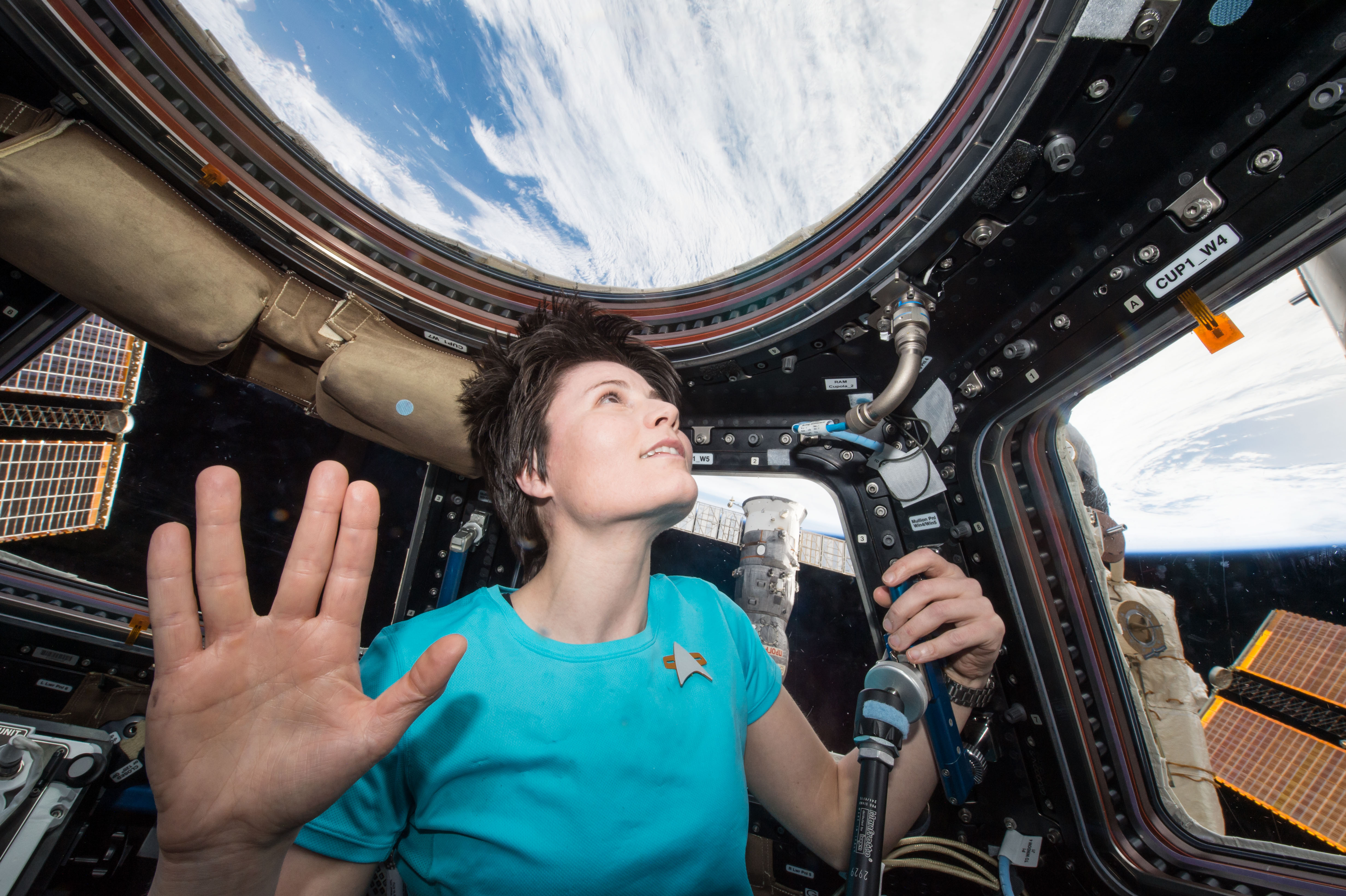
On February 28, 2015, International Space Station astronaut Samantha Cristoforetti paid tribute to Leonard Nimoy, who had died the previous day, with a Vulcan salute.

Star Trek has been the subject of a large number of parodies and tributes.

Prominent among film parodies is the 1999 film Galaxy Quest, as it parodied the original Star Trek series, elements of Star Trek: The Next Generation, and the whole Trekkie phenomenon.

On television, the animated series Futurama makes frequent references to Star Trek and parodies some of its better known plot elements on a regular basis, including the character Zapp Brannigan who is based on a combination of Captain Kirk and William Shatner, and cast members of the original series have taken part in one episode. Prominent examples in other television series include multiple episodes of The Simpsons and Family Guy. The children's series The Backyardigans has an episode titled "Garbage Trek" that is an homage to the original series. Joss Whedon has cited Star Trek as being the father of his cult series Firefly and its film Serenity (2005).

The direct-to-video series VeggieTales features two Star Trek parodies, including "The Gourds Must Be Crazy" (from Are You My Neighbor?) and Veggies in Space: The Fennel Frontier which serves as a sequel to the other. The character Scooter is based on Montgomery Scott.

There are many other parodies in comic strips, music and computer games, such as Eminem's song "We Made You". In the music video, Eminem was dressed as Mr. Spock and Dr. Dre as Captain Kirk.

In 1995, MTV's animated series Beavis and Butt-Head parodied the series with Beavis as Captain Picard and Butt-Head as Commander Riker.

NASA and other institutions have paid explicit tribute to the series in the use of names of ships and characters from the series. Subtle acknowledgments in media and real life include the use of Star Trek ships' registry numbers, especially the Enterprise's NCC-1701.

Two episodes of Eek! The Cat parodied Star Trek (with the main character as a Captain Kirk-esque character; one episode featured William Shatner voicing the villain Captain Berserk).

In August 2010, the members of the Internal Revenue Service created a six-minute Star Trek themed training video for an agency conference. The video featured a mock set of the Enterprise in one of the agency's studios. The project cost 62 hours of staff time and cost $3,100. Revealed to the public in 2013, the spoof along with parodies of other media franchises was cited as an example of the misuse of taxpayer funds and "insulting the beloved sci-fi TV show".

Animaniacs has made an obvious parody of Star Trek, calling it Star Truck. Another Star Trek band, Warp 11, has released several studio albums.

Actor William Shatner re-enacted his battle fighting the Gorn, for an advertisement for the 2013 Star Trek video game (Kelvin Timeline). In the spot they have similar fight, but it takes place in a modern day living room starts with the two playing a console video game together in co-op mode.

=== The Orville ===
Starting in 2017, Seth MacFarlane produced a television series heavily inspired by the original Star Trek and its Next Generation successor, titled The Orville. Like the series it pays homage to, The Orville is set in the 25th century, features an interstellar alliance of Earth and many other planets, and follows an exploratory space vessel interacting with various monocultures.

== Locations ==
=== Canada ===
A limited number of Famous Players theatres in Canada house large replicas of the USS Enterprise (NCC-1701-A). They can be found in the cities of Thunder Bay, Windsor, Ottawa, Winnipeg and Richmond. In the Greater Toronto Area, replicas can be seen in the Yorkdale Shopping Centre, in the Cineplex at the Scarborough Town Centre, and in the SilverCity in Richmond Hill.

In addition, a replica of the Sovereign-class USS Enterprise (NCC-1701-E) can be found in Laser Planet in Oakville, Ontario as well as in the Colossus theatres, in Langley, British Columbia and Laval, Quebec.

The coincidentally-named Vulcan, Alberta hosts Trek-related memorabilia and events.

=== United States ===
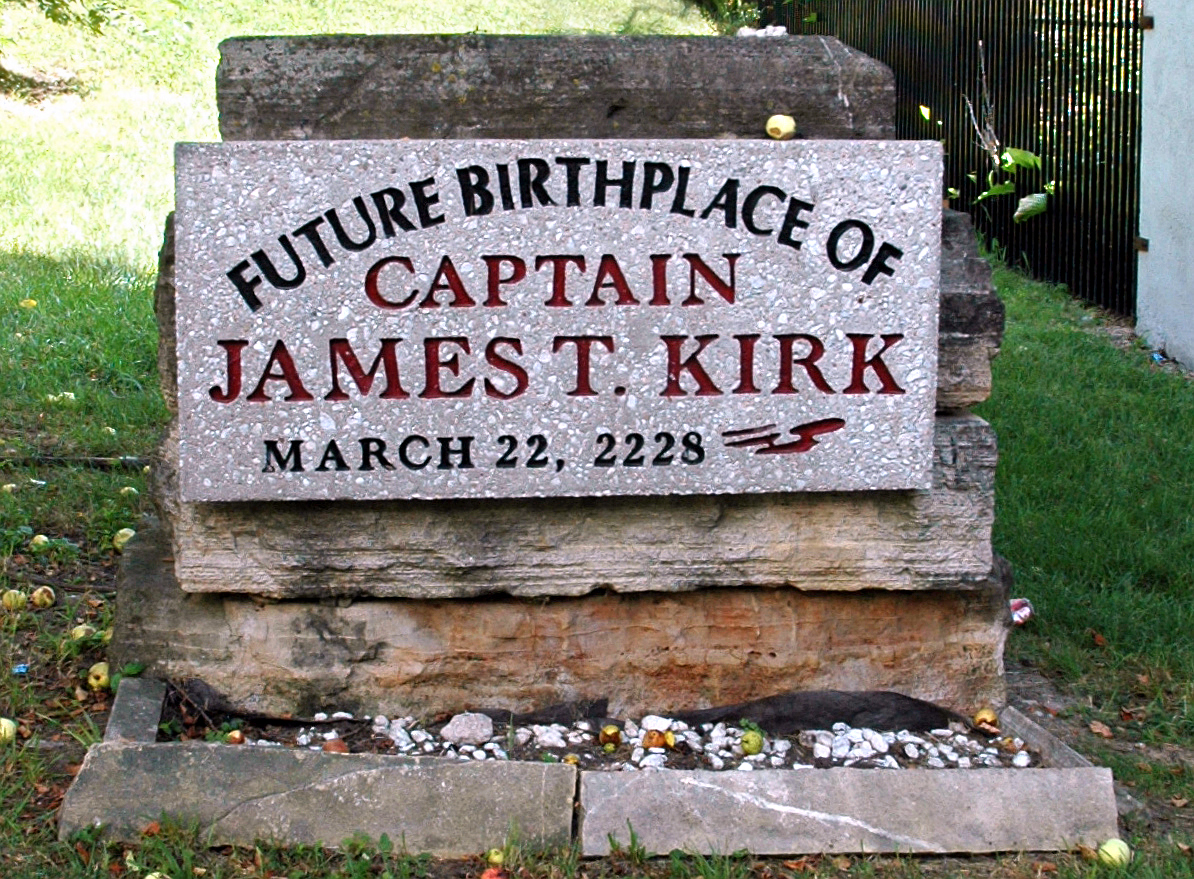
Plaque honoring the future birthplace of Captain James T. Kirk in Riverside, Iowa

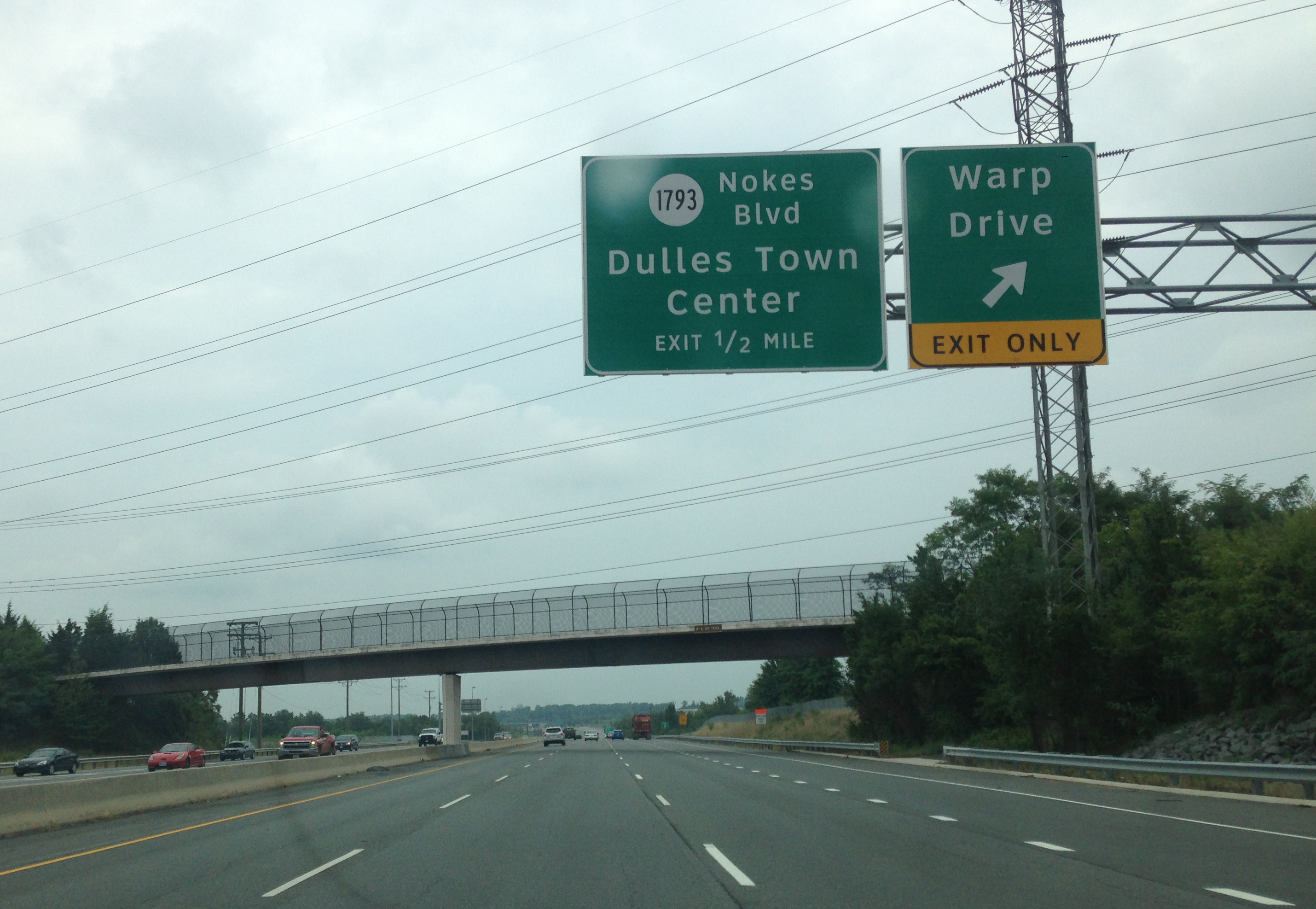
Exit sign for Warp Drive in Dulles, Virginia, one of many Trek-inspired roads in the United States

Riverside, Iowa has proclaimed itself the future birthplace of Captain James T. Kirk. Gene Roddenberry, the creator of Star Trek, asserts in the book The Making of Star Trek by Stephen Whitfield, that the character Kirk had been born in the state of Iowa. In March 1985, when the town was looking for a theme for its annual town festival, Steve Miller, a member of the Riverside City Council who had read Roddenberry's book, suggested to the council that Riverside should proclaim itself to be the future birthplace of Kirk. Miller's motion passed unanimously. The council later wrote to Roddenberry for his permission to be designated as the official birthplace of Kirk, and Roddenberry agreed. In the reboot Star Trek movie, Riverside is depicted as having a Starfleet shipyard on its outskirts, where the USS Enterprise (NCC-1701) was built.

The city of Garland, Texas is the first city known to have an official place name based on the television series: "Star Trek Lane", located off of Apollo Road and east of North Jupiter Road (32.953°N 96.681°W).

The city of Birmingham, Alabama also boasts a "Star Trek Lane" and "Star Trek Circle", in the Sunrise East subdivision of its Roebuck neighborhood.

The unincorporated Sky Parkway area of South Sacramento, California has a number of space-themed street names, including Klingon Court and Romulan Court.

An unincorporated area near the Las Vegas Strip contains a residential street named "Roddenberry Avenue". While the mailing address lists the avenue as being located in Las Vegas, Nevada, the physical address is an unincorporated township called "Enterprise". There is no indication that the township's name has any connection with the Star Trek series, and it is unknown whether or not the street name is a deliberate tribute to the Star Trek creator.

Turlock, California has a subdivision with several Trek-themed road names including Picard Lane, Warp Drive, Impulse Lane, Crusher Avenue and Federation Court.

Northern Virginia has a few Star Trek-inspired locations including Warp Drive at the headquarters of local space company Orbital ATK, named such at the request of the company; and the Intelligence and Security Command's Information Dominance Center, whose interior was designed to mimic the bridge of the Enterprise by a Hollywood set designer. The Steven F. Udvar-Hazy Center annex of the National Air and Space Museum occasionally hosts set pieces and movie screenings.

== Star Trek and space exploration ==
The series greatly influenced public interest in the United States Space Program and in education on the topic of space exploration. Star Trek: The Original Series ran from 1966 to 1969 benefited from the popularity of the televised July 1969 Apollo 11 Moon landing. The association between Star Trek and NASA grew stronger over time – the first NASA orbiter shuttle, Space Shuttle Enterprise, was named after the USS Enterprise of Star Trek fame. The IXS Enterprise, NASA's conceptual design for a superluminal spacecraft, was similarly named after the USS Enterprise in 2014.

Nichelle Nichols appeared in a promotional film aimed at recruiting women and people of color to apply to be astronauts. The next astronaut class, appointed in 1978, included Guy Bluford, the first Black American in space, and Sally Ride, the first American woman in space.

NASA Administrator Bill Nelson remembered Nichols in a statement:

“Nichelle Nichols was a trailblazing actress, advocate and dear friend to NASA. At a time when Black women were seldom seen on screen, Nichelle’s portrayal as Nyota Uhura on Star Trek held a mirror up to America that strengthened civil rights,” said Administrator Bill Nelson. “Nichelle’s advocacy transcended television and transformed NASA. After Apollo 11, Nichelle made it her mission to inspire women and people of color to join this agency, change the face of STEM and explore the cosmos. Nichelle’s mission is NASA’s mission. Today, as we work to send the first woman and first person of color to the Moon under Artemis, NASA is guided by the legacy of Nichelle Nichols.”

This connection remained solid through the 1990s, when many of the cast members began narrating documentaries about the franchise's content and space exploration. Some of these documentaries were produced in cooperation with NASA itself, most notably the IMAX title Destiny in Space (1994), narrated by Leonard Nimoy. In 2013, NASA produced a 30-second commercial to accompany the theatrical release of Star Trek Into Darkness in an effort to bolster support for its space program.

In addition, NASA has named a number of asteroids after people or elements connected to the Star Trek franchise:

- 2309 Mr. Spock
- 4659 Roddenberry
- 7307 Takei
- 9777 Enterprise
- 26733 Nanavisitor
- 26734 Terryfarrell
- 68410 Nichols
- 155142 Tenagra

== Star Trek and government activities ==
In addition to space exploration, other government activities have been influenced by Star Trek. In 2020, the United States effort to develop a vaccine to protect against COVID-19 was named Operation Warp Speed, which is the brainchild of a huge Star Trek fan, Dr. Peter Marks. Dr. Marks led the unit at the Food and Drug Administration which approves vaccines and therapies.

== See also ==
- Star Wars sources and analogues amongst which includes Star Trek as an inspiration for Star Wars.
