= Warp =

Warp, WARP, warped or warping may refer to:

== Arts and entertainment ==
=== Books and comics ===
- WaRP Graphics, an alternative comics publisher
- Warp (First Comics), comic book series published by First Comics based on the play Warp!
- Warp (comics), a DC Comics supervillain
- Warp (magazine), formerly the magazine and official organ of the New Zealand National Association for Science

=== Music ===
- Warp (record label), an independent UK record label
  - Warp Films, a side project of Warp Records
  - Warp 10: Influences, Classics, Remixes, a series of compilation albums issued by Warp Records in 1999

==== Albums ====
- Warp (album), 1982 album by New Musik
- Warp, 2001 album by the Japanese band Judy and Mary
- W.A.R.P.E.D., a 2005 album by Savatage guitarist Chris Caffery

==== Songs ====
- "Warp", 2009 single by The Bloody Beetroots
- "Warped" (song), a song by the Red Hot Chili Peppers from their 1995 album One Hot Minute
- "Warped", a song by Blackfoot from the 1980 album Tomcattin'
- "Warping", a song by Death Grips from the album Bottomless Pit

=== Video games ===
- Warp (video games), an element in video games that allows a character to travel instantly between two locations
- Warp (company), now known as From Yellow to Orange, a Japanese video game developer
- Warp (1985 video game), an interactive fiction game developed for the HP3000 platform
- Warp (1989 video game), a shoot 'em up by Thalion Software
- Warp (2012 video game), a download only game for consoles where you warp an alien through labs
- Warp (Warhammer 40000), home of the Chaos powers in the Warhammer 40000 series
- Crash Bandicoot 3: Warped, a platform game developed by Naughty Dog for the PlayStation

=== Other arts and entertainment ===
- Warp Darkmatter, a character in animated TV series and the pilot episode Buzz Lightyear of Star Command: The Adventure Begins and Buzz Lightyear of Star Command
- Warp!, a 1970s Broadway play
- Warped!, a television series.
- Warp drive, a fictional faster-than-light propulsion system in science fiction
- WARP-CD, a low-power TV station in Tampa-St. Petersburg, Florida, US
- Warped Tour, an annual touring music and extreme sports festival

== Science and technology ==
- Alcubierre drive, a hypothetical means of propulsion also called a "warp drive"
- Bow and warp of semiconductor wafers and substrates, a warp parameter of the semiconductor wafer
- WIMP Argon Programme (WArP), a cold dark matter search experiment
- Warped geometry, a type of Lorentzian manifold satisfying certain specific properties

=== Computing ===
- OS/2 Warp, a name for version 3.0 of the IBM operating system
- Warp (agentic development environment)
- WARP (systolic array), a series of systolic array machines
- Windows Advanced Rasterization Platform, a Direct3D software rasterizer included in Microsoft Windows 7 and higher
- WARP (information security) (Warning, advice and reporting point), a service to share computer-based threats
- WARP, a VPN service developed by Cloudflare that is part of 1.1.1.1 app
- Image warping, the process of distorting an image digitally
- Softwarp, a software technique to warp an image so that it can be projected on a curved screen
- Warped linear predictive coding, a tool used in audio signal processing
- Warp (CUDA), data parallelism per instruction proposed by CUDA
- Warp (terminal), a command line terminal

== Transportation ==
=== Aviation ===
- Star-Lite Warp 1-A, an American ultralight aircraft design
- Wing warping, a manner of controlling the roll of an aeroplane
- Warp Drive Inc, a US propeller manufacturer

=== Ships ===
- Warping (sailing), a slow method of moving a boat in still waters or against the wind
- Anchor Warp, a line (particularly a rope) attached to an anchor

== Other uses ==
- Warping in agriculture, the practice of flooding agricultural land with turbid river water to add sediment to the soil
- Weak Axiom of Revealed Preferences, an axiom in the economic theory of revealed preference
- Wood warping, a deviation from flatness due to uneven drying of wood
- Warp (weaving), the set of lengthwise threads attached to a loom
- Warp knitting, a major style of knitting
- Warp Drive, a street in Dulles, Virginia, US
- Wins Above Replacement Player, a statistical means of evaluating player production in various team sports

== See also ==
- Warpe (disambiguation)
- Warp zone (disambiguation)
- Warp and weft (disambiguation)
