= Warpe =

Warpe may refer to:

- Warpe, Lower Saxony, a municipality in Germany
- Warpes, an ethnic group of Argentina
- Warpe languages

== See also ==
- Warp (disambiguation)
- Varpe, a village in Estonia
- Wörpe, a river in Germany
