= Information Sharing and Analysis Center =

Nonprofit organization

- Abbreviation: ISAC

An Information Sharing and Analysis Center (ISAC) is an organization that provides a central resource for gathering information on cyber and related threats to critical infrastructure and providing two-way sharing of information between the private and public sectors.

Sector ISACs began forming in 1999, subsequent to the May 22, 1998 signing of U.S. Presidential Decision Directive-63 (PDD-63), when "the federal government asked each critical infrastructure sector to establish sector-specific organizations to share information about threats and vulnerabilities." Decision Directive-63 (PDD-63) was replaced by Homeland Security Presidential Directive 21 in 2013.

== Australia ==
- Critical Infrastructure Information Sharing & Analysis Centre (CI-ISAC)

== Canada ==
- Global Mining and Metals Information Sharing & Analysis Centre (MM-ISAC)

== Europe ==
European Energy - Information Sharing & Analysis Centre (EE-ISAC) is a network of private utilities, solution providers and (semi) public institutions such as academia, governmental and non-profit organizations which share valuable information on cyber resilience to strengthen the cyber security of the European Power Grid.

== India ==
In India, the Information Sharing and Analysis Center (ISAC) operates as an independent non-profit organization that works closely as Public-Private-Partner (PPP) with the apex nodal agency for cyber security, National Critical Information Infrastructure Protection Center (NCIIPC), designated under the IT Act Law 2000.

== Japan ==
- Financials ISAC Japan
- ICT Information Sharing And Analysis Center Japan
- Japan Electricity Information Sharing and Analysis Center
- Japan Foreign Trade Council ISAC
- Medical ISAC Japan Cyber Security Service (MICSS)
- Transportation ISAC JAPAN

== Singapore ==
- Operational Technology (OT-ISAC)

== United States ==
The National Council of ISACs (NCI Directorate) members include:

- Automotive (Auto-ISAC)
- Aviation (A-ISAC)
- Communications ISAC (NCC)
- Defense Industrial Base (National Defense ISAC (ND-ISAC)
- Emergency Services (EMR-ISAC)
- Electricity (E-ISAC)
- Energy Analytic Security Exchange (EASE)
- Elections Infrastructure (EI-ISAC)
- Financial Services (FS-ISAC)
- Healthcare Ready
- Health (Health-ISAC)
- Information Technology (IT-ISAC)
- Maritime Security (MTS-ISAC)
- Media and Entertainment (ME-ISAC)
- Multi-State [State, Local, Tribal and Territorial (SLTT) Governments] (MS-ISAC)
- NGO (NGO-ISAC)
- Nuclear (NEI)
- Oil and Gas (ONG-ISAC)
- Public Transit (PT-ISAC)
- Real Estate (RE-ISAC)
- Research & Education Network (REN-ISAC)
- Retail & Hospitality (RH-ISAC) Formerly R-CISC
- Space (S-ISAC)
- Supply Chain (SC-ISAC)
- Surface Transportation (ST-ISAC)
- Water (Water-ISAC)

Many other ISACs exist beyond the National Council of ISACS, which caters only to sectors the US government has declared Critical Infrastructure sectors, such as MFG-ISAC, LS-ISAC, SEAL-ISAC, CR-ISAC, and REN-ISAC.

== See also ==
- Computer emergency response team
- Warning, Advice and Reporting Point (WARP)
