= The Real Estate Roundtable =

- Abbreviation: RER
- Type: Nonprofit association Trade association Lobbying; Public relations
- Purpose: Public policy related to real estate
- Headquarters: Washington, D.C.
- President and CEO: Jeffrey D. DeBoer
- Main organ: Board of directors
- Affiliations: Commercial Real Estate Diverse Supplier (CREDS) Consortium; RE-ISAC
- Website: www.rer.org

The Real Estate Roundtable is a non-profit public policy think tank based in Washington, D.C. that represents the interests of real estate. It develops public policy agendas pertaining to tax, capital and credit, environment and energy, and homeland security.

== History ==
In 1999, the National Realty Committee (NRC) became The Real Estate Roundtable. In 1985, the NRC had 280 member organizations: property developers, banks, insurance companies, brokerages and accounting concerns.

The Real Estate Roundtable announced its formation of the Real Estate ISAC (RE-ISAC), an Information Sharing and Analysis Center, in February 2003.

Jeffrey D. DeBoer has served as the president and CEO of The Real Estate Roundtable since its formation. Randall K. Rowe was elected chairman in 1998. John F. Fish became the chairman in 2021.

== Activities ==
The Real Estate Roundtable holds four annual meetings in Washington, D.C. and publishes a weekly electronic newsletter, "Policy Toolkits and Fact Sheets", and its Annual Report and Policy Agenda.

Activities of the organization are divided amongst its committees:

- Equity, Diversity, and Inclusion (ED&I)
- Homeland Security Task Force (HSTF)
- Real Estate Capital Policy Advisory (RECPAC)
- Research
- Sustainability Policy Advisory (SPAC)
- Tax Policy Advisory

The organization was a member of the Economic Growth Alliance in the 1990s. In 2023, it became one of seven real estate trade association member organizations composing the Commercial Real Estate Diverse Supplier (CREDS) Consortium.

In 2017, the organization opposed the full-expensing of structures proposed under the Tax Cuts and Jobs Act (TCJA), arguing for real estate investment to be "demand-driven, not tax-driven."

On January 8, 2020, the organization issued a statement strongly denouncing the January 6 United States Capitol attack.

The Real Estate Roundtable wrote to U.S. President Joe Biden in December 2022, urging the federal government to both influence a greater return to office work from remote work, and to expedite under-used office space conversions for housing.

== Membership ==
Since 2021, 67% of the organization is composed of members from public and privately owned real estate enterprises. An additional 20% of members are connected to financial services, 3% are asset managers, and 10% are real estate trade associations.

Membership is by invitation and is divided between two tiers, Roundtable and President's Council, each with a cap of 100 members. Membership in Roundtable is offered to leaders of national real estate entities or major real estate trade associations. All four annual meetings are open to members of the Roundtable. Membership of the President's Council is also offered to industry leaders, but those whose operations may be more regional. These members are invited to two of the annual meetings, the Annual Meeting and the State of the Industry meeting.

== See also ==
- National Association of Realtors
- Urban Land Institute
