= Mara Ahmed =

Pakistani American filmmaker

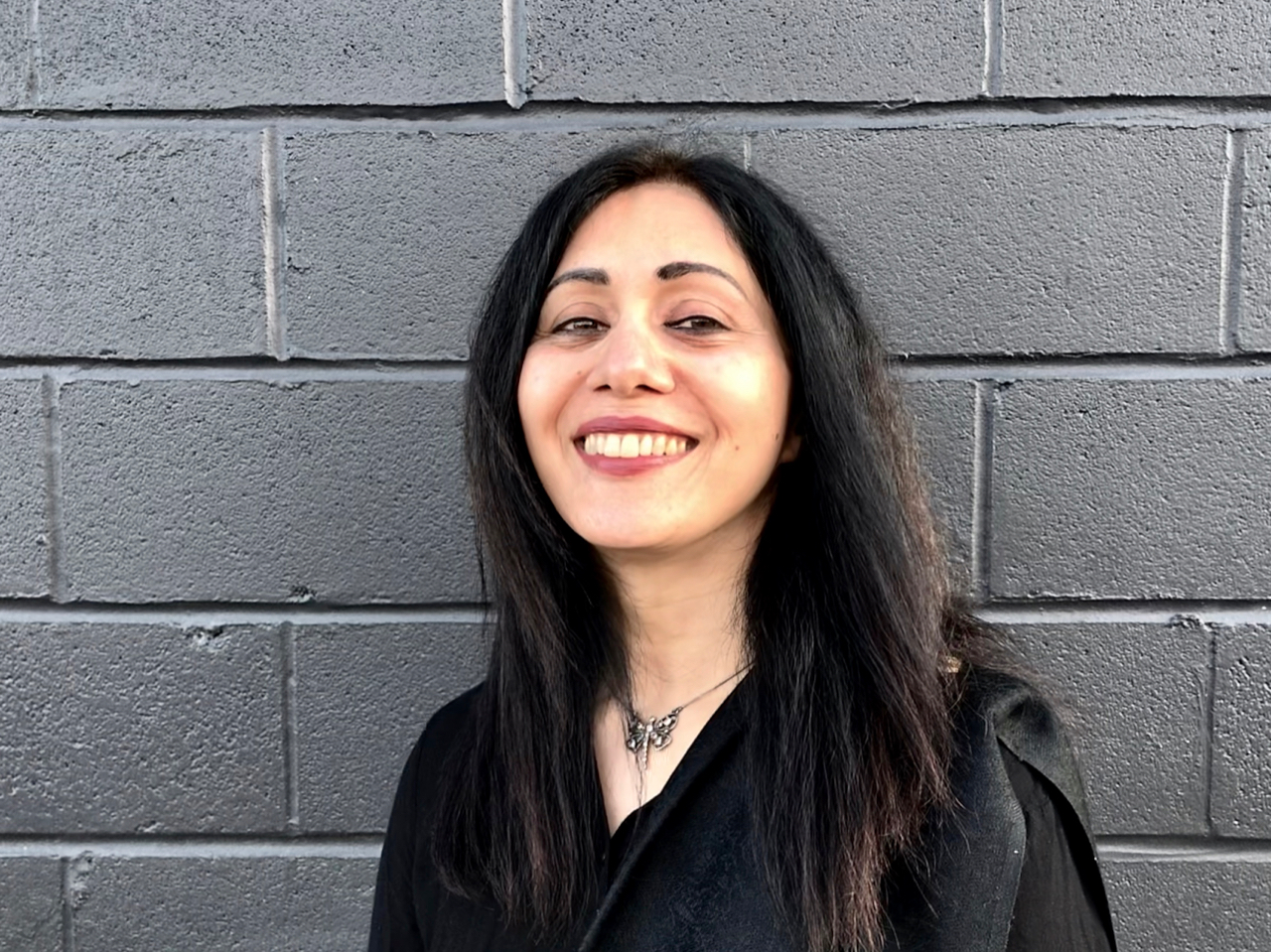
- Born: Lahore, Pakistan
- Occupations: Interdisciplinary artist and filmmaker
- Known for: Neelum Films
- Notable work: The Muslims I Know; Pakistan One on One; A Thin Wall; The Injured Body
- Website: maraahmed.com

Mara Ahmed is an American interdisciplinary artist and filmmaker based on Long Island, New York, United States. Her production company is Neelum Films.

== Early life and education ==
Mara Ahmed was born in Lahore, Pakistan. She has lived and been educated in Belgium, Pakistan and the United States. She has an MBA and a second master's degree in Economics. She worked in corporate finance before launching her career in film.

== Film career ==
Ahmed's film training began at the Visual Studies Workshop and later continued at the Rochester Institute of Technology. She began to shoot her first documentary, The Muslims I Know, a response to the post-9/11 negative stereotyping of Muslims in mainstream media in 2006. The Muslims I Know premiered at the Dryden Theatre in 2008.

Ahmed's second film, Pakistan One on One, a survey of public opinion in Pakistan about issues of interest to Americans, premiered in 2011 at the Little Theatre. Both her films were broadcast on PBS.

A Thin Wall, Ahmed's third documentary, was released in 2015. It focused on personal stories from the Partition of India in 1947 and was shot on both sides of the border, in India and Pakistan. The film was written and directed by Ahmed and co-produced by Indian filmmaker Surbhi Dewan.

A Thin Wall opened at the Bradford Literature Festival and was introduced by British poet John Siddique, whose work is featured in the film.

Ahmed was interviewed about A Thin Wall on Voice of America and RCTV.

She gave a Ted talk about the meaning of borders and nationalism, entitled The Edges that Blur, in 2017.

That same year, Ahmed began work on a new documentary inspired by Claudia Rankine's book, Citizen: An American Lyric. The Injured Body: A Film about Racism in America will focus on micro-aggressions via interviews with a diverse group of women of color.

In 2023, Ahmed was awarded a New York State Council on the Arts grant, through the Community Regrant Program administered by the Huntington Arts Council, for her art and film project Return to Sender: Women of Color in Colonial Postcards & the Politics of Representation. Ahmed's films can be found on Vimeo on Demand.

== Art exhibitions ==
Mara Ahmed works in a variety of media including film, photography, collage and writing. Her work was featured in the 2005 documentary Identity Through Art, along with five other Asian-American artists.

Her artwork was exhibited at the Kinetic Gallery, at SUNY Geneseo, in 2008. Synthesis was a multi-media exhibition that captured Ahmed's journey from Pakistan to the US.

In 2014, This Heirloom, a series of analog and digital collages that connect the artist's own family history to the Partition of India, was exhibited at the Colacino Gallery, at Nazareth College in New York.

It was also shown at the Oakland Asian Cultural Center in 2018 and was part of Current Seen, Rochester's Small Venue Biennial in 2019.

== Activism and writing ==
Ahmed is involved in social justice and community work. She writes and presents on topics related to Pakistan, Islamophobia, micro-aggressions, and the idea of decolonization.

In 2021, Ahmed was featured as a changemaker in Rochester Museum and Science Center's exhibit, The Changemakers: Rochester Women Who Changed the World, which showcased stories of women visionaries and trailblazers from Rochester, New York.

== The Warp & Weft ==
Ahmed began work on the Warp & Weft, a multilingual archive of stories that sought to capture the 2020 zeitgeist, in September of that year. The archive was transformed into a multimedia installation including text, audio and animation in 2022 when it was exhibited at Rochester Contemporary Art Center.
