= WARP (information security) =

Warning, Advice and Reporting Point (WARP) is a community or internal company-based service to share advice and information on computer-based threats and vulnerabilities.

WARPs typically provide:

- Warning – A filtered warning service, where subscribers receive alerts and advisory information on only the subjects relevant to them.
- Advice – An advice brokering service, where members can ask and respond to questions in a trusted secure environment.
- Reporting – Central collection of information on incidents and problems in a trusted secure environment. The collected information may then be anonymised and shared amongst the membership.

A WARP is a type of information sharing model. Computer emergency response teams and Information Sharing and Analysis Centers are alternative models.

For example, the UK Ministry of Defence operates a Defence Industry WARP. LACNIC, the regional internet registry for the Latin American and Caribbean regions, provides a WARP for the region.

== See also ==
- Information security management system
- British cyber security community
