= Single instruction, single data =

Class of computer architecture

In computing, single instruction stream, single data stream (SISD) is a computer architecture in which a single uni-core processor executes a single instruction stream, to operate on data stored in a single memory. This corresponds to the von Neumann architecture.

SISD is one of the four main classifications as defined in Flynn's taxonomy. In this system, classifications are based upon the number of concurrent instructions and data streams present in the computer architecture. According to Michael J. Flynn, SISD can have concurrent processing characteristics. Pipelined processors and superscalar processors are common examples found in most modern SISD computers.

Instructions are sent to the control unit from the memory module and are decoded and sent to the processing unit which processes on the data retrieved from memory module and sends back to it.
