= Warp Drive =

Short street in Sterling, Virginia

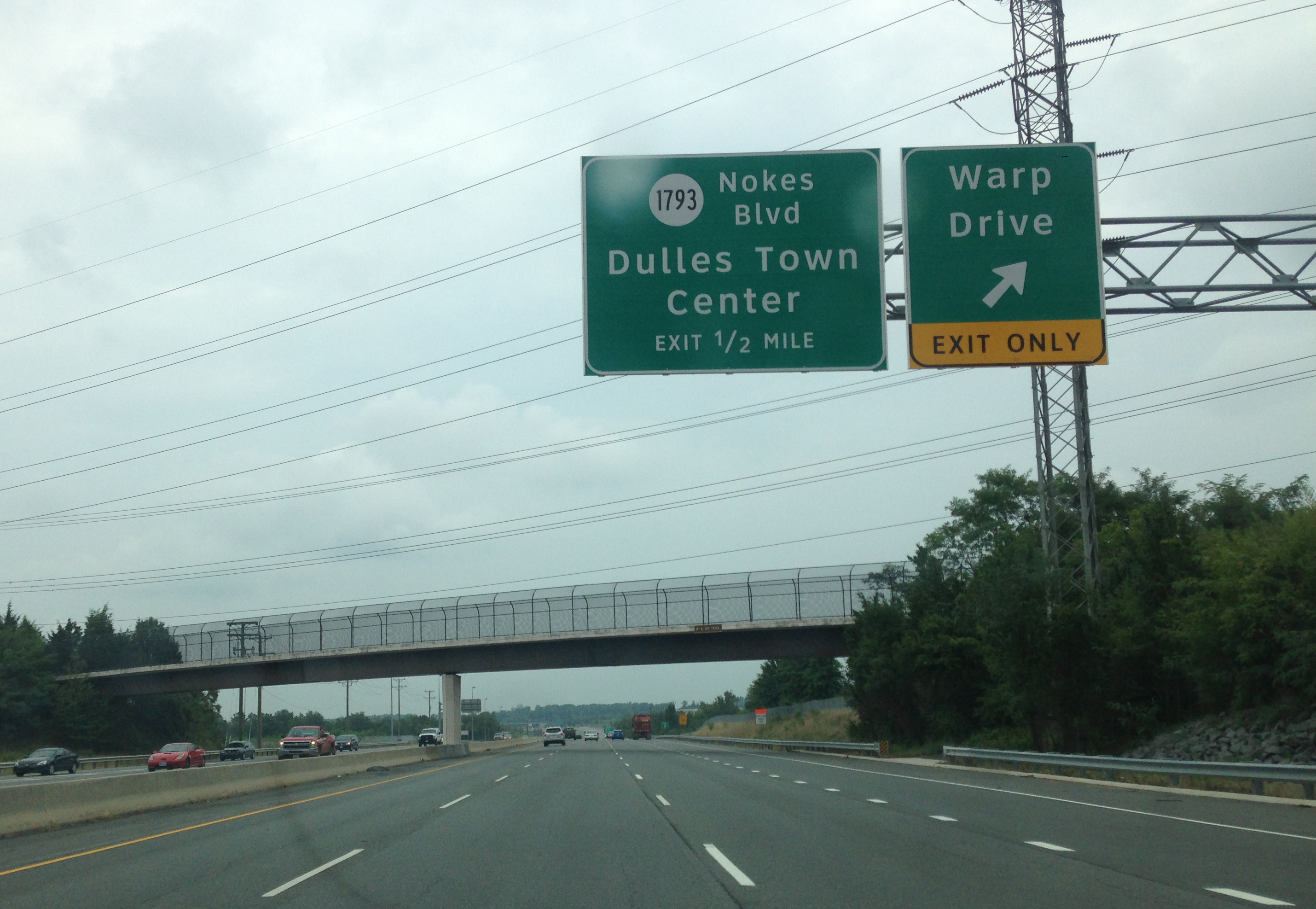
- Exit sign for Warp Drive on VA 28
- Interactive map of Warp Drive
- Former name: Steeplechase Drive
- Namesake: Fictional faster-than-light propulsion system on Star Trek
- Owner: Loudoun County, Virginia, US
- Length: 300 ft (91 m)
- Addresses: 45101
- Location: Sterling, Virginia, US
- Postal code: 20166
- Coordinates: 39.01379°N 77.42991°W
- West end: Traffic circle
- Major junctions: VA 28
- East end: Atlantic Boulevard

Other
- Known for: Name

Warp Drive is a short street in Sterling, Virginia, United States. (Note: A Warp Drive is also found in a Turlock, California, subdivision where other streets are named after the United Federation of Planets and characters from Star Trek: The Next Generation such as Jean-Luc Picard, Beverly Crusher and William T. Riker. The headquarters campus of Bigelow Aerospace in North Las Vegas, Nevada, also has a Warp Drive that intersects with a Star Wars-themed street, Skywalker Way.) Originally named Steeplechase Drive, it is located in an industrial park off Atlantic Boulevard, and primarily serves as the address for Northrop Grumman Innovation Systems, an aerospace company. The street ends at a circle where an off-ramp from Virginia State Highway 28 joins from the opposite direction.

In 2011, employees of Orbital Sciences—later acquired by Northrop—asked the Loudoun County Board of Supervisors to rename their street after the warp drive that allows ships in the Star Trek universe to travel faster than light. The supervisors voted unanimously to make it so (several of them using catchphrases associated with the franchise).

== Street ==
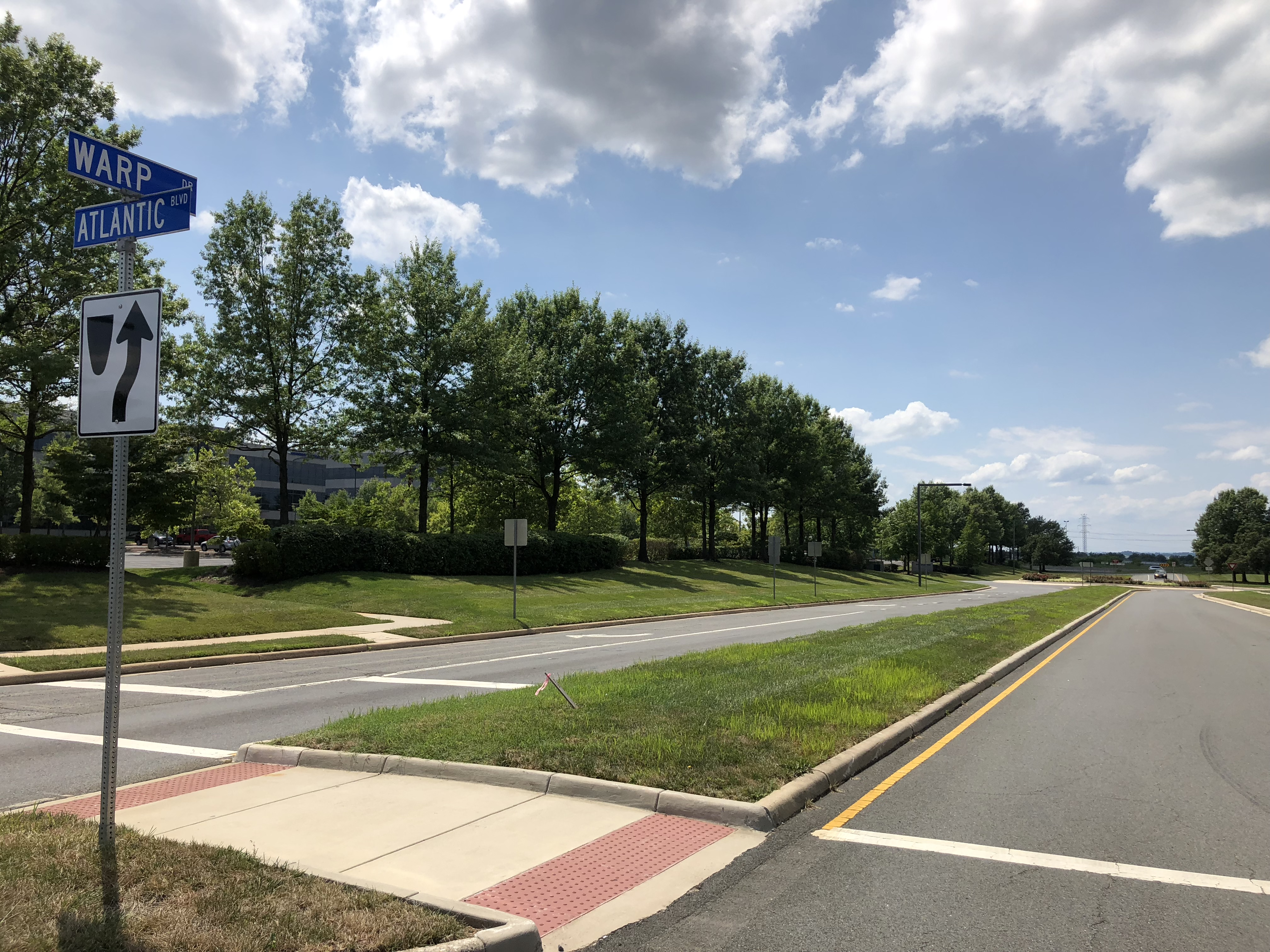
Warp Drive viewed from Atlantic Boulevard

Warp Drive's eastern terminus is a signalized three-way intersection with Atlantic Boulevard, roughly one half-mile (800 m) north of its southern terminus at Church Road (Virginia State Route 625) at Sterling. The area is developed in a pattern typical of eastern Loudoun County's edge-city suburban sprawl. On either side of Atlantic at the intersection are office buildings surrounded by parking lots, all facilities of Northrop Grumman Innovation Systems, with some newer residential subdivisions to the southeast and, across the Cabin Branch of Broad Run, the east. The Washington & Old Dominion Trail runs to the immediate southwest.

To the northeast is another office building with an artificial pond. The northwest corner of the intersection, and the entire north side of Warp Drive, is a large undeveloped parcel. From the intersection, the street runs 300 ft (100 m) west, divided by a grass median strip, to a small traffic circle that gives access to driveways into Orbital's facilities on the north and south. On the west side is the end of a one-way offramp that gives access to Warp from Sully Road (Virginia State Route 28), roughly 500 feet (150 m) to the west.

== History ==
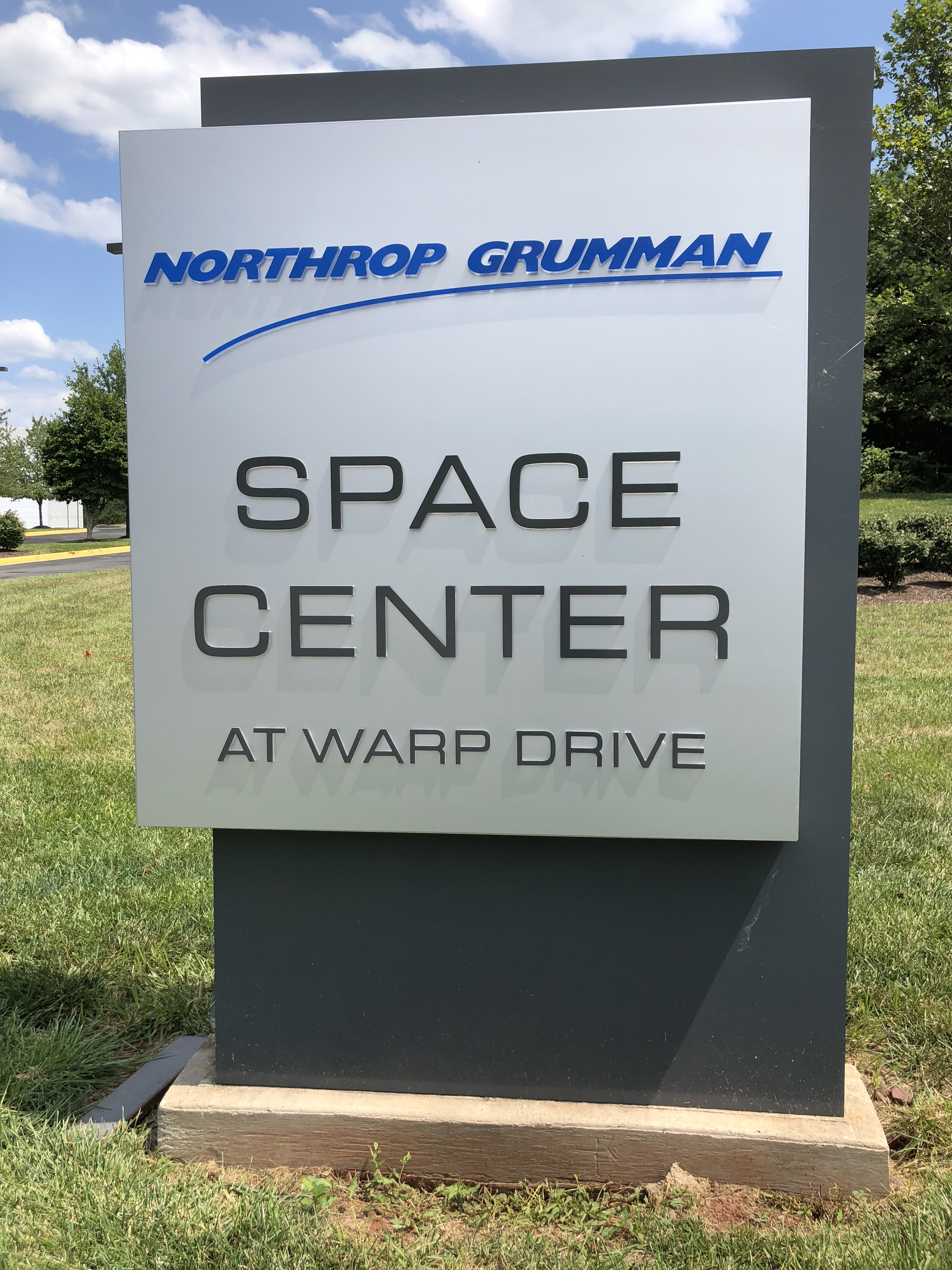
Northrop Grumman facility entrance sign using the street name

Orbital Sciences Corporation was founded in 1982 to provide rocket engines and parts to aerospace and defense customers public and private. It has always been headquartered in Northern Virginia, like many other defense contractors. In 1993 it moved into its current complex in Sterling.

At that time the short street where Orbital was located was known as Steeplechase Drive. In 2011 the company's executives, who were fans of Star Trek, asked the Loudoun County Board of Supervisors to formally rename the street Warp Drive, after the faster-than-light "warp drive" propulsion technology used by the franchise's starships. At the last meeting of the year, the board voted unanimously to grant the request.

Officially, the county said the change was made to "improve the identity and to better integrate the Orbital campus." But supervisors were less formal when discussing the issue, which had originally been on a consent agenda. Several cast their votes with catchphrases from the original Star Trek series. "To Orbital, live long and prosper," said Stevens Miller, who lived in Sterling. Board member Eugene Delgaudio asked, "Can you give me any speed, Scotty?", incorrectly using a Scottish accent as he did so.

One supervisor, Jim Burton of the Blue Ridge District, tried to be serious. He reminded the board that "warp" had other meanings. "You need to think about it before you vote on it" he warned. "Would you prefer 'Beam me up, Scotty?'", the board's chairman replied. In the end the vote was unanimous. "What more uplifting motion could there possibly be than something that will literally make law out of a Star Trek joke?" concluded Miller. "It's a great idea. I look forward to driving on Warp Drive myself." Orbital agreed to reimburse the county for the approximately $500 it would cost to replace the street sign.

The online Ashburn Patch noted how the name change reflected the changes to Loudoun County in the past two decades. While the western portion of the county has stayed largely rural and agricultural, as evoked by the street's original name of Steeplechase Drive, eastern Loudoun has grown tremendously during that same time as many businesses, in particular high-tech defense contractors like Orbital, have located in the area. "So Orbital's request to change the name of the road along its perimeter from Steeplechase Drive to Warp Drive brings to mind the county's dichotomy," it observed. "Out with the horse-racing theme and in with space."

On September 18, 2017, Northrop Grumman announced plans to purchase Orbital for $7.8 billion in cash plus assumption of $1.4 billion in debt. Orbital shareholders approved the buyout on November 29, 2017. The FTC approved the acquisition with conditions on June 5, 2018, and one day later, Orbital was absorbed and became Northrop Grumman Innovation Systems.

== See also ==
- Cultural influence of Star Trek
