= Brad Karp (computer scientist) =

American computer scientist

- Education: Yale University; Harvard University
- Awards: Royal Society Wolfson Research Merit Award
- Scientific career
- Workplaces: University College London
- Thesis: Geographic Routing for Wireless Networks (2000)
- Doctoral advisor: H. T. Kung
- Website: www.cs.ucl.ac.uk/staff/b.karp/

Brad Nelson Karp is an American computer scientist, specializing in computer networks. He obtained his bachelor's degree from Yale University in 1992 and got his master's and Ph.D. from Harvard University in 1995 and 2000 respectively, under the supervision of H. T. Kung. Later on he became a staff scientist at the Center for Internet Research and at the International Computer Science Institute in Berkeley, California where he worked until 2002. After working as a senior staff researcher at Intel Research of Pittsburgh and as an adjunct assistant professor at Carnegie Mellon University, he moved in 2005 to University College London, where he is now a reader. In 2005, he was a winner of the Royal Society Wolfson Research Merit Award.
