= Founders at Work =

2007 non-fiction work by Jessica Livingston

Founders at Work: Stories of Startups' Early Days
- Author: Jessica Livingston
- Language: English
- Publisher: Apress
- Publication date: 2007
- Publication place: United States
- Media type: Hardcover
- ISBN: 1-59059-714-1

Founders at Work: Stories of Startups' Early Days (2007) is a book written by Jessica Livingston composed of interviews she did with the founders of famous technology companies concerning what happened in their early years.

== Interviews ==
1. Max Levchin - PayPal
2. Sabeer Bhatia - Hotmail
3. Steve Wozniak - Apple Computer
4. Joe Kraus - Excite
5. Dan Bricklin - Software Arts
6. Mitch Kapor - Lotus
7. Ray Ozzie - Iris Associates, Groove Networks
8. Evan Williams - Pyra Labs (Blogger.com)
9. Tim Brady - Yahoo
10. Mike Lazaridis - Research in Motion
11. Arthur van Hoff - Marimba
12. Paul Buchheit - Gmail
13. Steve Perlman - WebTV
14. Mike Ramsay - TiVo
15. Paul Graham - Viaweb
16. Joshua Schachter - del.icio.us
17. Mark Fletcher - ONElist, Bloglines
18. Craig Newmark - craigslist
19. Caterina Fake - Flickr
20. Brewster Kahle - WAIS, Internet Archive, Alexa Internet
21. Charles Geschke - Adobe
22. Ann Winblad - Open Systems, Hummer Winblad
23. David Heinemeier Hansson - 37signals
24. Philip Greenspun - ArsDigita
25. Joel Spolsky - Fog Creek Software
26. Steve Kaufer - TripAdvisor
27. James Hong - HOT or NOT
28. James Currier - Tickle
29. Blake Ross - Creator of Firefox
30. Mena Trott - Six Apart
31. Bob Davis - Lycos
32. Ron Gruner - Alliant Computer, Shareholder.com

== Reception ==
- Chris Anderson, editor-in-chief of Wired Magazine stated "this book offers both wisdom and engaging insights straight from the source."
- The Motley Fool says "The stories are fascinating, filled with many valuable lessons."
