= Robert Tappan Morris =

American computer scientist; creator of Morris Worm; associate professor at MIT

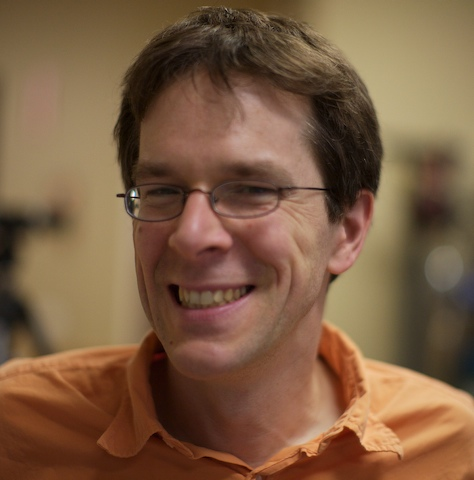
- Robert Morris in 2008
- Born: November 8, 1965 (age 60); United States
- Other name: RTM
- Education: Harvard University (BA); Cornell University (PhD)
- Occupations: Entrepreneur, professor at Massachusetts Institute of Technology, partner at Y Combinator
- Known for: Morris Worm; Viaweb; Y Combinator
- Parent(s): Robert Morris, Anne Farlow Morris
- Relatives: Meredith Morris, Benjamin Morris (siblings)
- Status: Fulfilled
- Motive: "To demonstrate the inadequacies of current security measures on computer networks by exploiting the security defects that Morris had discovered."
- Convictions: United States Code: Title 18 (18 U.S.C. § 1030, the Computer Fraud and Abuse Act (CFAA), March 7, 1991)
- Penalty: 3 years of probation, 400 hours of community service, and fines of $10,050 plus costs of his supervision
- Website: pdos.csail.mit.edu/rtm

Robert Tappan Morris (born November 8, 1965) is an American computer scientist and entrepreneur. He is best known for creating the Morris worm in 1988, considered the first computer worm on the Internet.

Morris was prosecuted for releasing the worm, and became the first person convicted under the then-new Computer Fraud and Abuse Act (CFAA). He went on to cofound the online store Viaweb, one of the first web applications, and later the venture capital funding firm Y Combinator, both with Paul Graham, Jessica Livingston and Trevor Blackwell.

He later joined the faculty in the department of Electrical Engineering and Computer Science at the Massachusetts Institute of Technology (MIT), where he received tenure in 2006. He was elected to the National Academy of Engineering in 2019.

== Early life and education ==
Morris was born in 1965 to parents Robert Morris and Anne Farlow Morris. The senior Robert Morris was a computer scientist at Bell Labs, who helped design Multics and Unix; and later became the chief scientist at the National Computer Security Center, a division of the National Security Agency (NSA).

Morris grew up in the Millington section of Long Hill Township, New Jersey, attended The Peck School, and graduated from Delbarton School in 1983.

Morris attended Harvard University, and later went on to graduate school at Cornell University.

== Morris worm ==
Morris's computer worm was developed in 1988, during his first year of graduate school at Cornell. He released the worm from MIT, rather than from Cornell. This was to avoid the worm being traced directly back to Cornell, where he was a Ph.D. student at the time. The worm exploited several vulnerabilities to gain entry to targeted systems, including:

- A hole in the debug mode of the Unix sendmail program
- A buffer overflow or overrun hole in the fingerd network service
- The transitive trust enabled by people setting up network logins with no password requirements via remote execution (rexec) with Remote Shell (rsh), termed rexec/rsh

The worm was programmed to check each computer it found to determine if the infection was already present. However, Morris believed that some system administrators might try to defeat the worm by instructing the computer to report a false positive. To compensate for this possibility, Morris programmed the worm to copy itself anyway, 14% of the time, no matter what the response was to the infection-status interrogation.

This level of persistence was a design flaw: it created system loads that brought it to the attention of administrators and disrupted the target computers. During the ensuing trial, it was estimated that the cost in "potential loss in productivity" caused by the worm and efforts to remove it from individual systems ranged from $200 to $53,000 per system, representing a total economic impact of up to $10,000,000.

=== Criminal prosecution ===
In 1989, Morris was indicted for violating United States Code Title 18 (18 U.S.C. § 1030), the Computer Fraud and Abuse Act (CFAA). He was the first person to be indicted under this act. In December 1990, he was sentenced to three years of probation, 400 hours of community service, and a fine of $10,050 plus the costs of his supervision. He appealed, but his conviction was affirmed the following March. Morris's stated motive during the trial was "to demonstrate the inadequacies of current security measures on computer networks by exploiting the security defects [he] had discovered." He completed his sentence as of 1994.

== Later life and work ==
After serving his conviction term, Morris returned to Harvard to complete his Doctor of Philosophy (Ph.D.) under the supervision of H. T. Kung. In 1995, Morris cofounded Viaweb with Paul Graham, a start-up company that made software for building online stores. It would go on to be sold to Yahoo for $49 million, which renamed the software Yahoo! Store. In 1999, Morris received his Ph.D. in Applied Sciences from Harvard for a thesis titled Scalable TCP Congestion Control. That same year, he was appointed as an assistant professor at MIT.

In 2005, Morris cofounded Y Combinator, a seed-stage startup venture capital funding firm that provides seed money, advice, and connections at two 3-month programs per year (with Paul Graham, Trevor Blackwell, and Jessica Livingston). In 2006, Morris was awarded tenure at MIT and became a technical advisor for Cisco Meraki. In 2008, released the programming language Arc, a Lisp dialect, alongside Paul Graham.

In 2010, Morris was awarded the 2010 Special Interest Group in Operating Systems (SIGOPS) Mark Weiser award. In 2015, Morris was elected a Fellow of Association for Computing Machinery (ACM, 2014) for "contributions to computer networking, distributed systems, and operating systems." In 2019, Morris was elected to the National Academy of Engineering.

== Work ==
Morris's principal research interest is computer network architectures, which includes work on distributed hash tables such as Chord and wireless mesh networks such as Roofnet.

He is a longtime friend and collaborator of Paul Graham. Along with cofounding two companies with him, Graham dedicated his book ANSI Common Lisp to Morris and named the programming language that generates the online stores' web pages RTML (Robert T. Morris Language) in his honor. Graham lists Morris as one of his personal heroes, saying that Morris is "never wrong."

== See also ==
- Cyberpunk: Outlaws and Hackers on the Computer Frontier – 1991 nonfiction book by Katie Hafner and John Markoff
- Fancy Bear Goes Phishing - book on the history of hacking by Scott J. Shapiro
- List of convicted computer criminals
