= Jessica Livingston =

American businesswoman and writer (born 1971)

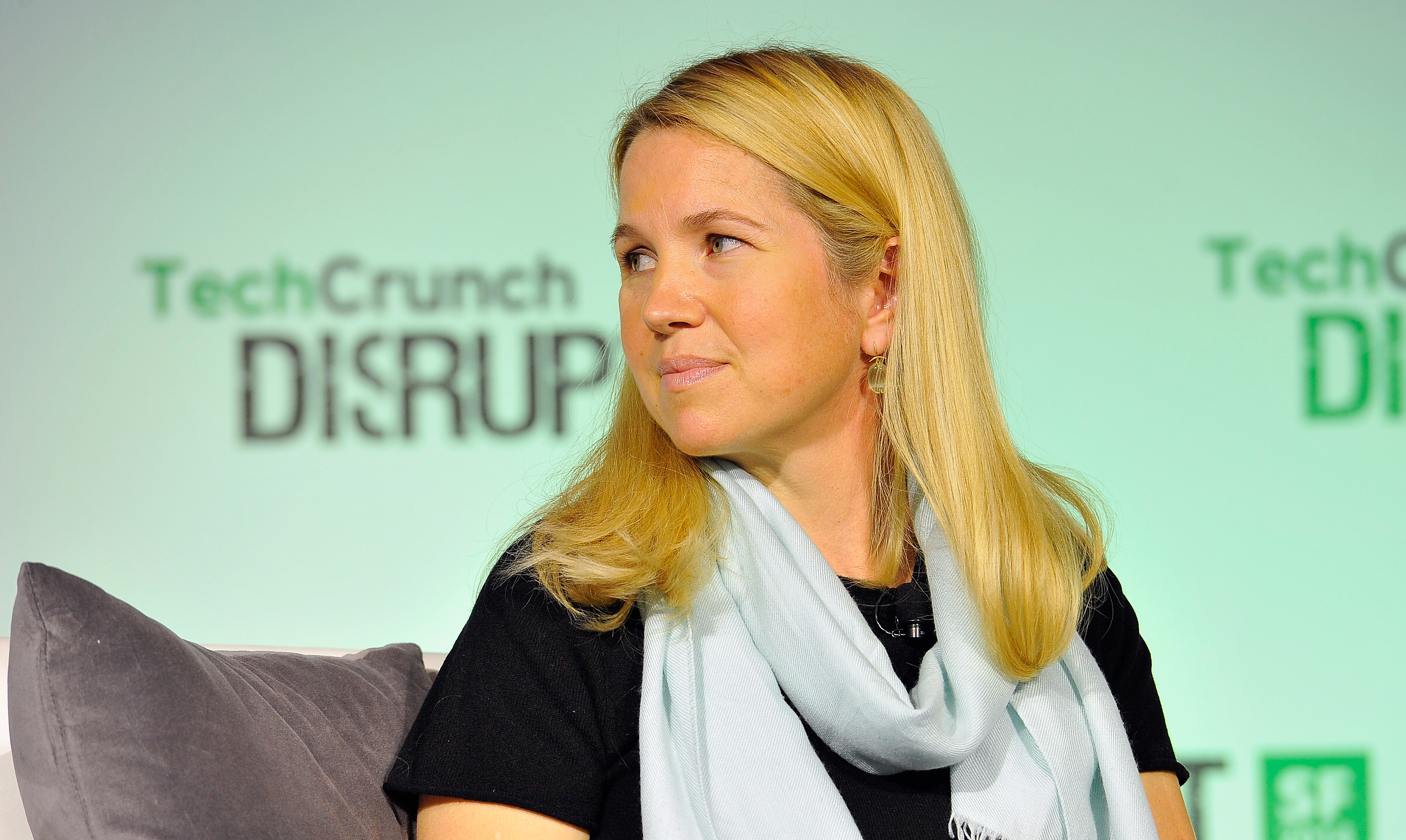
- Livingston at TechCrunch Disrupt in 2014
- Born: 1971 (age 54–55)
- Education: Bucknell University (BA)
- Occupations: Businesswoman, Writer, Venture Capitalist
- Organization: Y Combinator
- Known for: Co-founding Y Combinator, Founders at Work: Stories of Startups' Early Days
- Notable work: Founders at Work: Stories of Startups' Early Days
- Spouse: Paul Graham
- Website: foundersatwork.posthaven.com

Jessica Livingston (born 1971) is an American investor, writer, and podcaster. She is best known for being a founding partner of the seed stage venture firm Y Combinator.

== Early life and education ==
Livingston was born in Minneapolis, Minnesota, and later relocated to the Boston area, raised in large part by her father and grandmother. In 1989, she graduated from Phillips Academy. Later, she received a Bachelor of Arts with a major in English from Bucknell University.

== Career ==
After college, Livingston pursued an array of jobs, including work at Fidelity, the Food & Wine magazine, an automotive consulting firm, and a wedding planning service. Later, she served as vice president of marketing at Adams Harkness Financial Group, an investment bank.

Livingston met Paul Graham, Robert Morris and Trevor Blackwell (the co-founders of dot-com company Viaweb) at a party in Cambridge. They discussed creating a startup incubator, and in 2005 the four co-founded Y Combinator (YC). In the early days of YC, Livingston and Graham hosted weekly meals for their founders at their home near Cambridge. Sam Altman (a former YC partner) credits Livingston with being essential to the transformation of Y Combinator into a startup ecosystem. When Graham stepped down from his leadership role and Altman succeeded him, Livingston became more involved in the organization's daily operations, including overseeing its Startup School program.

In early 2007, Livingston published Founders at Work: Stories of Startups' Early Days, a collection of interviews with famous startup founders, including Steve Wozniak.

In 2013, Livingston launched the Female Founders conference with the aim of inspiring more women to found startup companies.

In 2016, she took a year-long sabbatical from the incubator to spend time with her family and consider projects and other things she wanted to pursue.

Livingston is one of the financial backers of OpenAI, a for-profit company aiming to develop artificial general intelligence.

In 2023, she started co-hosting The Social Radars podcast alongside fellow YC partner Carolynn Levy.

== Personal life ==
Livingston married Paul Graham in 2008. They have two children. Since late 2016, the family has resided in the United Kingdom.
