= RSS tracking =

RSS tracking is a methodology for tracking RSS feeds.

== History ==
RSS feeds have been around since 1999 as a form of internet marketing, however unlike other forms of publishing information on the internet, it is difficult to track the usage of RSS feeds. Feed tracking methods have been growing in popularity

== Technology ==
There are currently many methods of tracking RSS feeds, all with their own problems in terms of accuracy.

=== Method 1 ===
Transparent 1×1 pixel images - These images can be embedded within the content of the RSS feed by linking to the image which should be held on the web server. The number of requests made can be measured by using the web server log files. This will give a rough estimate as to how many times the RSS feed has been viewed.

The problem with this method is that not all RSS feed aggregators will display images and parse HTML.

=== Method 2 ===
Third-party services - There are services available on the Internet that will syndicate your RSS feed and then track all requests made to their syndication of your RSS feed. These services come in both free and paid forms.

The problem with this method is that all analytical data about the feeds are controlled by the service provider and so not easily accessible or transferable.

=== Method 3 ===
Unique URL per feed - This method requires heavy web server programming to auto generate a different RSS feed URL for each visitor to the website. The visitor's RSS feed activity can then be tracked accurately using standard web analytics applications.

The problem with this method is that if the feed is syndicated by a search engine for instance then this will defeat the purpose of the unique URLs as many people could potentially view the RSS feed via a single URL.

=== Method 4 ===
Estimating number of subscribers from the log files. Some aggregators (for example, Bloglines and Google Reader) include a number of unique users on whose behalf the feed is being downloaded in the HTTP request. Other readers -- such as web browsers -- can be counted by noting the number of unique IP addresses that retrieve the file in a given period.

This provides an estimate of actual readership, although it is probably higher than the real number because people may sign up for accounts with multiple aggregators and never delete their subscriptions and because they may read the same feeds at different computers, or the same computer may have a different IP address at different times.
