= Walton Hale Hamilton =

American economist

Walton Hale Hamilton (October 30, 1881 – October 27, 1958) was an American law professor who taught at Yale Law School (1928–1948). In 1919, Hamilton coined the term "institutional economics".

== Life and work ==
Born in Tennessee, Hamilton received a B.A. degree from the University of Texas at Austin in 1907 and a Ph.D. degree from the University of Michigan in 1913. He married Lucile Elizabeth Rhodes in 1909; they had three children. The couple later divorced and he married Irene Till, on July 20, 1937, adopting her son Robert (Robert W. Hamillton) by a previous marriage later having two children, Douglas and Leslie. He died in Washington, D.C., on October 27, 1958.

Hamilton was a professor of law at the Yale Law School from 1928 to 1948, and was ultimately appointed Southmayd Professor of Law, emeritus. He taught courses in trade regulation, torts, and public control of business.

Considered a leading figure in the legal realism movement at Yale, Hamilton was a vigorous critic of legal formalism and sought to apply the insights of economic studies to the law.

He argued that legal concepts evolved in specific historical and social contexts and that, when they were removed from their context and generalized into universal legal principles, they led to socially undesirable, often unexpected results. He developed these arguments in a series of articles in the 1930s, which included: Affectation with a Public Interest (1930), The Ancient Maxim Caveat Emptor (1931), and The Path of Due Process of Law (1938).

Hamilton also undertook a series of industry studies that sought to show that wages and prices were not set by market forces as understood by neoclassical economists but instead depended on social and historical contexts, so that the results were noncompetitive wages and prices. These studies showed that the degree of competition in effect in any industry depended on legal control devices tolerated or regulated depending on the consciousness of a public interest in the industry and the political will to recognize it.

== Publications ==
Hamilton authored the following works, among others:

- Current Economic Problems (1915, 1925)
- Institutional Approach to Economic Theory (1919)
- Price and Price Policies (1938)
- The Pattern of Competition (1940)
- Patents and Free Enterprise (1941)
- The Politics of Industry (1951)

He co-authored:

- The Control of Wages (1923)
- The Case of Bituminous Coal (1925)
- A Way of Order for Bituminous Coal (1928)
- The Power to Govern (1937)
- Antitrust in Action (1940)
