= Akhil Reed Amar =

American legal scholar (born 1958)

Akhil Amar
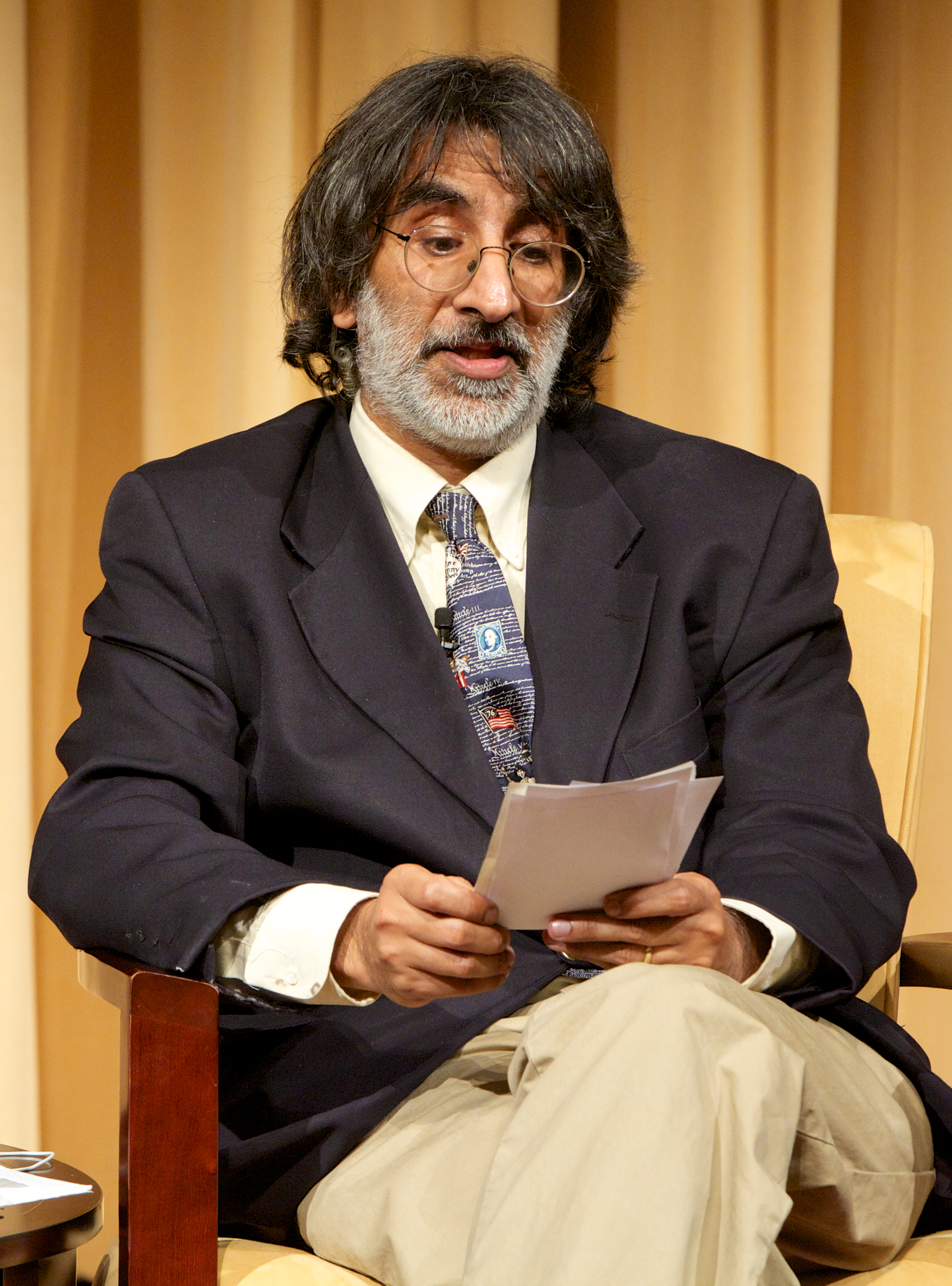
- Amar in 2014
- Born: September 6, 1958 (age 68); Ann Arbor, Michigan, U.S.
- Education: Yale University (BA, JD)
- Title: Sterling Professor of Law and Political Science
- Relatives: Vikram Amar (brother)
- Awards: Paul M. Bator Award (1993)

Academic work
- Discipline: Constitutional law
- Institutions: Yale University
- Notable students: Brett Kavanaugh; John Yoo; Neal Katyal; Chris Coons; Michael Bennet; Jake Sullivan; Cory Booker; Sarah Cleveland; Cyrus Habib; Josh Hawley; Stephanos Bibas; Stephen A. Higginson; Jill A. Pryor; William J. Nardini; Neera Tanden; Hampton Dellinger; Jeffrey Rosen; Brian Deese; Steven Engel; Rob Bonta; Alex Azar; Candace Jackson-Akiwumi; Michael Barr; Kermit Roosevelt III; Josh Chafetz; Steve Vladeck; William Baude; John Fabian Witt; James Forman Jr.; Stephen E. Sachs; Daniel Markovits; Maggie Goodlander

Akhil Reed Amar (born September 6, 1958) is an American legal scholar and Sterling Professor of Law and Political Science at Yale University. He is known for his scholarship on a wide range of topics in U.S. constitutional law, including voting rights, jury reform, the Guarantee Clause, the Electoral College, jurisdiction stripping, the Bill of Rights, the Fourteenth Amendment, judicial power, American federalism, American slavery, originalism, and criminal procedure.

After graduating from Yale Law School, Amar served as a law clerk for Judge Stephen Breyer. Later, he joined the Yale Law School faculty in 1985 at the age of 26. He is Yale's only living professor to have received the University's unofficial triple crown: the title of Sterling Professor for scholarship, the DeVane Medal for teaching, and the Lamar Award for alumni service.

His work has been cited by Supreme Court justices across the spectrum in more than 50 cases — the most of any scholar under 70. His work has also been cited in every federal court of appeals. In American law reviews, he has been cited more frequently than any other constitutional scholar under age 70.

== Early life and education ==
Amar was born on September 6, 1958, in Ann Arbor, Michigan. He has two brothers, one of whom is Vikram Amar, who is also a legal scholar and is a Distinguished Professor of Law at the University of California, Davis School of Law. His parents were young physicians from India who met at the University of Michigan. His father became a professor at the University of California, San Francisco. His middle name comes from his father's mentor, Reed M. Nesbit.

Amar grew up in Walnut Creek, California and was active in the Boy Scouts of America, earning the rank of Eagle Scout. He graduated from Las Lomas High School in 1976. He then attended Yale University, where he double majored in history and economics. He was a member of the Yale Debate Association, winning its Thacher Memorial Prize, and was chair of the Liberal Party of the Yale Political Union.

His undergraduate mentors included American historians Edmund Morgan and John Morton Blum. He graduated from Yale College in 1980 with a Bachelor of Arts, summa cum laude, with membership in Phi Beta Kappa. In 1981, Amar entered Yale Law School, where he became an editor of The Yale Law Journal and had Robert Bork as a teacher. His most notable mentors in law school were Guido Calabresi, Owen Fiss, Burke Marshall, and Bruce Ackerman. He graduated in 1984 with a Juris Doctor degree. After law school, Amar was a law clerk for then-judge Stephen Breyer of the U.S. Court of Appeals for the First Circuit from 1984 to 1985.

== Academic career ==
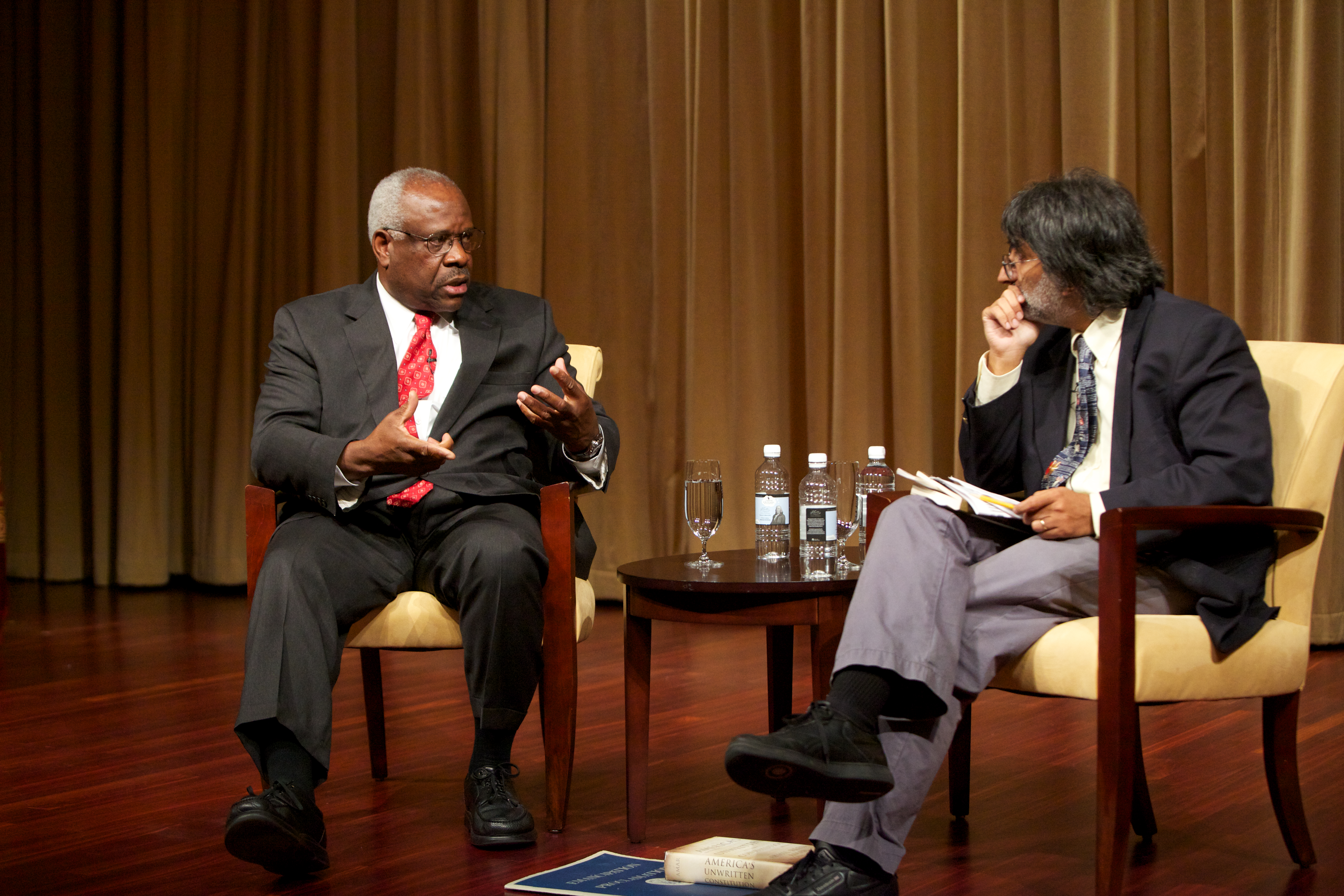
Amar speaks with Justice Clarence Thomas (left) at the National Archives in 2012

Amar joined the faculty of Yale Law School in 1985 as an assistant professor, became an associate professor in 1988, and was promoted to full professor in 1990. From 1993 to 2008, he held the Southmayd Professorship of Law. In 2008, he was appointed Sterling Professor of Law, the law school’s highest academic rank.

Amar's former students include U.S. senators Cory Booker, Michael Bennet, Chris Coons, and Josh Hawley, as well as government officials and judges including Jake Sullivan, Neal Katyal, Alex Azar, Michael Barr, Brian Deese, Stephanos Bibas, Goodwin Liu, and Rob Bonta. Justice Brett Kavanaugh briefly attended one of Amar’s constitutional law courses while a student at Yale Law School. He is the author of more than one hundred law review articles and several books, including The Words That Made Us: America's Constitutional Conversation, 1760–1840 and its sequel Born Equal: Remaking America's Constitution, 1840–1920. Amar has stated that the books are part of a planned trilogy, with a third volume tentatively titled Earth's Best Hope: America's Constitution, 1920–Present.

=== Honors and awards ===
Amar’s books have received several awards and recognitions. In 1998–99, he received an ABA Certificate of Merit for The Bill of Rights: Creation and Reconstruction. His 2005 book, America’s Constitution: A Biography, received the ABA's annual Silver Gavel Award. His 2012 book, America’s Unwritten Constitution, was named one of the 50 notable nonfiction books of the year by The Washington Post. His 2015 book, The Constitution Today, was included on Time magazine’s list of top nonfiction books of the year. His 2025 book Born Equal: Remaking America’s Constitution, 1840–1920 received the Abraham Lincoln Institute’s annual book award and the 2026 Scribes Book Award.

His books have also received multiple starred reviews from Publishers Weekly and Kirkus Reviews.

In 1993, Amar received the annual Paul M. Bator Award from the Federalist Society. In 2007, he was elected a fellow of the American Academy of Arts and Sciences.

In 2008, U.S. presidential candidate Mike Gravel stated that, if elected president, he would nominate Amar to the Supreme Court.

In 2015, President Barack Obama nominated Amar to the National Council on the Humanities. The Senate did not hold a confirmation vote. That same year, Amar received the William Clyde DeVane Medal for Undergraduate Teaching Excellence, Yale’s highest teaching award.

In 2017, he received the Outstanding Scholar Award from the American Bar Foundation and the Association of Yale Alumni’s Howard R. Lamar Award for Outstanding Faculty Service to Yale Alumni. In 2024, Amar received the Barry Prize for Distinguished Intellectual Achievement from the American Academy of Sciences and Letters.

=== Professional activities and public engagement ===
Amar has testified before the United States Congress on constitutional law issues at the invitation of members of both major political parties. He has also delivered named lectures at over 100 universities, colleges, and schools in the United States and abroad. From 1999 to 2004, he was a contributing editor to The New Republic. In the early 2000s, he participated in efforts to establish the National Constitution Center. He has served as a trustee of the American Exchange Project and the New York Historical.

=== Media, podcasting, and commentary ===
Amar has participated in a range of media and public educational projects. In the early 2000s, he served as an informal consultant to the television series The West Wing. He was referenced by name in a 2004 episode as a Yale Law School classmate of the fictional character Josh Lyman. Several later episodes addressed themes related to Amar’s published work on presidential succession and the Twenty-Fifth Amendment.

Since early 2021 he has co-hosted a weekly podcast, Amarica’s Constitution with a fellow Yale alumnus, Andy Lipka.

== Selected contributions to legal scholarship ==
=== 1984-1994 ===
Amar was first hired by Yale Law School at age 26. He was one of the school's two youngest hires in the last century, alongside Guido Calabresi.

In a 1985 article, Amar argued that Article III jurisdiction consists of two distinct tiers of lawsuits. In the first tier, he argued, federal jurisdiction is mandatory: in “all cases” arising under federal law and in “all cases” affecting public ambassadors, public ministers, and consuls, at least one Article III court must be available to hear the case at trial or on final appeal. In the second tier of “controversies” defined by party alignment (such as diversity suits between citizens of different states), Congress may give the first and last word to state courts. The article has been described as a 'landmark' contribution to Article III scholarship and has been influential in debates over congressional control of federal jurisdiction. Amar later revisited aspects of this theory in subsequent scholarship on Article III and the federal judiciary.

During the Constitution's bicentennial year, 1987, he published "Of Sovereignty and Federalism", which addressed issues of popular sovereignty, federalism, constitutional remedies, and governmental immunity. Amar proposed that states should adopt what he termed "Converse-1983" laws to provide remedies for individuals whose federal constitutional rights had been violated by federal officials. The article also criticized governmental immunity doctrines that, in Amar's view, unduly limited remedies for constitutional violations. The article has continued to receive scholarly attention in discussions of federalism and constitutional remedies. The article has been cited in more than 1,000 law review articles. In 2025 and 2026, several states enacted or considered legislation modeled on Amar's converse-1983 proposal.

In 1991, Amar published an article on the Bill of Rights. He argued that the original Bill of Rights blended states' rights and community rights (such as jury-related rights and militia-related rights) with individual rights, raising questions about how the Bill of Rights could be incorporated to apply to states through the Fourteenth Amendment. In a 1992 article in the Yale Law Journal and a 1998 book on the Bill of Rights, Amar defended incorporation—applying the provisions of the Bill of Rights against the states—but argued that it should be implemented in a "refined" form that distinguished individual rights from structural and collective rights. Amar's theory of "refined incorporation" contributed to an ongoing scholarly discussion. Amar has argued that the Second Amendment originally reflected a more communitarian and localist conception of gun rights, whereas the Fourteenth Amendment supported a more individual-rights-oriented understanding. Amar's scholarship became part of the modern revival of academic support for the individual-right interpretation of the Second Amendment. Amar has also written that a range of reasonable gun regulations would pass constitutional muster. The 1998 book received substantial attention from other constitutional scholars.

=== 1994-2004 ===
In 1994, Amar published an article reconceptualizing the Fourth Amendment. He argued that the Amendment contains neither a global warrant requirement nor a global probable-cause requirement, and that the Amendment was designed to prohibit general warrants but not to prevent all or even most warrantless intrusions. He further argued that the Amendment presupposed damage remedies for unlawful searches, rather than the exclusion of reliable evidence, and the exclusionary rule wrongly rewards the guilty and has no proper constitutional foundation. In Amar’s view, courts should adopt a broad understanding of searches and seizures, and should focus on reasonableness as the central Fourth Amendment standard. The article generated scholarly discussion concerning the original meaning of the Fourth Amendment and the constitutional foundations of the exclusionary rule. In 1995, Amar published an article on the self-incrimination doctrine of the Fifth Amendment, and in 1996, he completed the trilogy with an article on Sixth Amendment first principles. In these years, he also returned to the topic of juries in an article outlining ten suggestions for jury reform.

In 1999, he coined the term "intratextualism" to describe an interpretive approach that examines how certain distinctive words and phrases appear repeatedly in the Constitution. The article generated scholarly debate over constitutional methodology, including an extended response by Adrian Vermeule and Ernest Young questioning aspects of Amar's interpretive approach.

In November 2000, he wrote the Foreword to the Harvard Law Review, arguing that constitutional interpretation should place greater emphasis on the Constitution's text, history, and structure, and less on judicial doctrine. The Foreword contributed to ongoing debates over originalism and constitutional methodology as part of the development of a modern "liberal originalist" approach to constitutional interpretation. Amar has argued this approach draws on the writings of figures such as Abraham Lincoln and Hugo Black.

In 2000, Amar argued that the Electoral College was initially intended to placate slaveholders, who disfavored direct-national-election proposals. According to Amar, slaveholders understood that slaves would not have counted in a direct-election system, but the Founders’ electoral-college system cleverly enabled slave states to get credit for their slave populations via the Constitution's Three-Fifths Clause.

In 2001, on the first anniversary of Bush v. Gore, Amar co-authored with his brother, legal scholar Vikram Amar, a series of online posts proposing an early version of what later became the National Popular Vote Interstate Compact (NPVIC), a set of state laws aiming to award the presidency to the national popular vote winner without a constitutional amendment. The Amar Plan, as it came to be known in some circles, differed in certain key ways from a similar blueprint published several months earlier by Northwestern University Professor Robert W. Bennett. Bennett and the Amar brothers "are generally credited as the intellectual godparents" of NPVIC. The current NPVIC proposal aims to take full effect once adopted by states totaling 270 electoral votes. As of April 2026, states with a collective 222 electoral votes have adopted the compact. Over the years, Amar has identified some legal and practical problems associated with the current NPVIC proposal.

In August 2002, Amar and co-author Steven G. Calabresi proposed that Congress could establish eighteen-year term limits for Supreme Court justices by statute. Amar later testified in support of this proposal before the Biden administration’s Presidential Commission on the Supreme Court of the United States in 2021.

In October 2002, Amar criticized central parts of the McCain-Feingold campaign finance law, arguing that it unconstitutionally restricted political speech and improperly shielded incumbent lawmakers from criticism.

=== 2005-Present ===
In 2005, Amar published a book analyzing the complete text of the Constitution, article by article and amendment by amendment. The book characterized the enactment of the Constitution as the “big bang” of the modern political world, emphasizing a ratification process in which more people were permitted to vote on the fundamental rules of government than in previous constitution-making processes. Amar argued that the Constitution was more democratic, more attentive to geography and national security, and more accommodating of slavery at the Founding than many previous accounts had recognized. He also continued arguing, as he had since 1987, that the Constitution was widely understood to prohibit unilateral secession. The book received extensive attention from reviewers and constitutional scholars, including a collection of commentaries in the Yale Law Journal examining Amar's historical and interpretive approach. Amar’s 2005 book won the annual 2006 ABA Silver Gavel Award.

In 2011 and 2013, he placed himself "at the intellectual forefront of filibuster reform” in a pair of essays (the first co-authored with former Senator Gary Hart) explaining how the Senate could, by a series of simple-majority votes, end or abridge supermajority filibuster rules. In 2013, the Senate used this simple-majority procedure to change its rules and confirm certain federal judicial nominees; In 2017, it did so again for a Supreme Court nomination. Within hours of the 2013 vote, Amar publicly claimed credit for having helped inspire this reform, along with Hart, declaring that “the nuclear-option genie is now out of the bottle,” and such procedures could be used more broadly in the future.

In 2021, Amar and his brother Vik published a law review article arguing that when regulating federal elections, state legislatures are bound by their state constitutions. Following the Supreme Court's decision in Moore v. Harper (2023), the article was cited in subsequent academic discussion of the case.

In 2021 and 2025, he published the first two volumes of a planned trilogy spanning the entire history of the American constitutional project. These first two volumes argued that the original Constitution was shaped most significantly by George Washington and later transformed by Abraham Lincoln. In March 2026, the latter volume received the Abraham Lincoln Institute's annual book award. In this work, Amar emphasized the concept of birth equality—the idea that American citizens born on American soil and under the American flag are all born equal, black or white, male or female, regardless of their parents’ religion or national origin or marital status or immigration status. In 2026, Amar and his brother Vikram authored a series of essays on SCOTUSblog in connection with an amicus brief they filed in the birthright citizenship case, Trump v. Barbara (2026). Drawing on themes developed in Amar's 2025 book, Born Equal, the essays argued that the Fourteenth Amendment's Citizenship Clause guarantees equal citizenship to nearly all persons born on American soil and explored the concept of equal citizenship "under the flag." After the Supreme Court held that President Trump's executive order restricting birthright citizenship violated the Fourteenth Amendment, the brothers published a follow-up essay, "Three Cheers for Barbara!", discussing the Court's decision and its implications for the constitutional meaning of birthright citizenship and equal citizenship.

== Personal life ==
Amar and his wife, Vinita Parkash, married in 1989 and have three children.

Amar has described himself as a pro-choice liberal. Some of his positions have drawn criticism from progressive commentators and legal scholars. He supported Brett Kavanaugh's appointment to the Supreme Court and argued that overturning Roe v. Wade would not undermine other privacy-related rights, including the right to use contraceptives and the right to interracial marriage, recognized in Griswold v. Connecticut and Loving v. Virginia, respectively.

== Selected works ==
=== Books ===
- The Constitution and Criminal Procedure: First Principles (1997) ISBN 0-300-06678-3
- For the People (with Alan Hirsch) (1997) ISBN 0-684-87102-5
- The Bill of Rights: Creation and Reconstruction (1998) ISBN 0-300-07379-8
- Processes of Constitutional Decisionmaking (ed. with Paul Brest, Sanford Levinson, and Jack M. Balkin) (2000) ISBN 0-7355-5062-X
- America's Constitution: A Biography (2005) ISBN 1-4000-6262-4
- America's Unwritten Constitution: The Precedents and Principles We Live By (2012) ISBN 978-0-465-02957-0
- The Bill of Rights Primer: A Citizen's Guidebook to the American Bill of Rights (with Les Adams) (2013) ISBN 978-1-62087-572-8
- The Law of the Land: A Grand Tour of Our Constitutional Republic (2015) ISBN 978-0-465-06590-5
- The Constitution Today: Timeless Lessons for the Issues of Our Era (2016) ISBN 978-0-465-09633-6
- The Words that Made Us: America's Constitutional Conversation, 1760-1840 (2021) ISBN 978-0-465-09635-0
- Born Equal: Remaking America's Constitution, 1840-1920 (2025) ISBN 978-1-541-60519-0

=== Articles ===
- Amar, Akhil Reed (1985). "A Neo-Federalist View of Article III: Separating the Two Tiers of Federal Jurisdiction". Boston University Law Review. 65 (2): 205–272.
- — (1987). "Of Sovereignty and Federalism". Yale Law Journal. 96 (7): 1425–1520. doi:10.2307/796493. JSTOR 796493.
- — (1988). "Philadelphia Revisited: Amending the Constitution Outside Article V". University of Chicago Law Review. 55 (4): 1043–1104. doi:10.2307/1599782. JSTOR 1599782.
- — (1989). "Marbury, Section 13, and the Original Jurisdiction of the Supreme Court". University of Chicago Law Review. 56 (2): 443–99. doi:10.2307/1599844. JSTOR 1599844.
- — (1991). "The Bill of Rights As a Constitution". Yale Law Journal. 100 (5): 1131–1210. doi:10.2307/796690. JSTOR 796690.
- — (1992). "Child Abuse As Slavery: A Thirteenth Amendment Response to DeShaney". Harvard Law Review. 105 (6): 1359–85. doi:10.2307/1341734. JSTOR 1341734.
- — (1992). "The Case of the Missing Amendments: R.A.V. v. City of St. Paul". Harvard Law Review. 106 (1): 124–61.
- — (1992). "The Bill of Rights and the Fourteenth Amendment". Yale Law Journal. 101 (6): 1193–1284. doi:10.2307/796923. JSTOR 796923.
- — (1994). "The Consent of the Governed: Constitutional Amendment Outside Article V". Columbia Law Review. 94 (2): 457–508. doi:10.2307/1123201. JSTOR 1123201.
- — (1994). "Fourth Amendment First Principles". Harvard Law Review. 107 (4): 757–819. doi:10.2307/1341994. JSTOR 1341994.
- —; Amar, Vikram David (1995). "Is the Presidential Succession Law Constitutional?". Stanford Law Review. 48 (1): 113. doi:10.2307/1229151. JSTOR 1229151.
- — (1995). "Reinventing Juries: Ten Suggested Reforms". UC Davis Law Review. 28 (4): 1169–1194.
- —; Lettow, Renée B. (1995). "Fifth Amendment First Principles: The Self-Incrimination Clause". Michigan Law Review. 93 (5): 1193–1284. doi:10.2307/1289986. JSTOR 1289986.
- — (1995). "Foreword: Sixth Amendment First Principles". Georgetown Law Journal. 84: 641–712.
- — (1996). "Attainder and Amendment 2: Romer's Rightness". Michigan Law Review. 95 (1): 203. doi:10.2307/1290134. JSTOR 1290134.
- — (1999). "Intratextualism". Harvard Law Review. 112 (4): 747–827. doi:10.2307/1342297. JSTOR 1342297.
- — (2000). "The Supreme Court, 1999 Term; Foreword: The Document and the Doctrine" (PDF). Harvard Law Review. 114 (1): 26–134. doi:10.2307/1342409. JSTOR 1342409.
- — (2008). "Heller, HLR, and Holistic Legal Reasoning". Harvard Law Review. 122 (1): 145–190.
- — (2009). "Bush, Gore, Florida, and the Constitution" (PDF). Florida Law Review. 61 (5): 945–68.
- — (2010). "Applications and Implications of the Twenty-Fifth Amendment". Houston Law Review. 47 (1).
- — (2011). "America's Lived Constitution" (PDF). Yale Law Journal. 120: 1734.
- — (2013). "The Lawfulness of Section 5 — and Thus of Section 5". Harvard Law Review. 126 (4): 109–121.
- — (2014). "The First Amendment's Firstness" (PDF). UC Davis Law Review. 47 (4): 1015.
- — (2014). "Lex Majoris Partis: How the Senate Can End the Filibuster on Any Day by Simple Majority Rule". Duke Law Journal. 47 (4): 1483–1502.
- —; Amar, Vikram David (2021). "Eradicating Bush-League Arguments Root and Branch: The Article II Independent State Legislature Notion and Related Rubbish". Supreme Court Review. 2021 (4): 1–51. doi:10.1086/720128.
- — (2021). "Term Limits/Time Rules for Future Justices: Eighteen Arguments for Eighteen Years" (PDF). CATO Supreme Court Review. 2021 (4): 9.

== See also ==
- National Popular Vote Interstate Compact
