= Fancy Bear Goes Phishing =

2023 book by Scott J. Shapiro

Fancy Bear Goes Phishing: The Dark History of the Information Age, in Five Extraordinary Hacks
- Author: Scott J. Shapiro
- Language: English
- Subject: Computer hacking
- Genre: Non-fiction: Politics; Computers; History
- Published: May 23, 2023
- Publisher: Farrar, Straus and Giroux, Macmillan Publishers
- Publication place: United States
- Media type: Print (Hardcover)
- Pages: 432
- ISBN: 9780374601171
- Website: Macmillan

Fancy Bear Goes Phishing: The Dark History of the Information Age, in Five Extraordinary Hacks is a book on the history of cybersecurity and computer hacking by Scott J. Shapiro, a professor of philosophy and law at Yale Law School. The book was published by Farrar, Straus and Giroux on May 23, 2023. The book was released to generally positive reviews.

== Synopsis ==
Fancy Bear Goes Phishing covers five computer hacks and their methods, as well as the political, legal and cultural impacts of the hacks. It examined the Morris Worm, a computer virus named after its creator Robert Tappan Morris. The book examines how the virus spread using various technological methods, including exploits from a backdoor in the Unix sendmail program and a buffer overflow exploit in the finger network service.

Fancy Bear discussed Dark Avenger, the pseudonym of a computer virus writer from Bulgaria who had a very signature style of writing computer viruses. In the discussion of Dark Avenger, Shapiro examines the use of Internet forums used by typical computer hackers in exchanging their ideas and viruses. Shapiro also examines the typical psychological profile of a hacker and their reasons for getting started in, and subsequent departure from the computer hacking scene.

Fancy Bear discussed the hacking of Paris Hilton's phone and the ultimate release of her sex tape by Cameron LaCroix. Shapiro discusses the hack and uses it as a lens to explain social engineering in computer security and the intersection between computers and modern telecommunications equipment.

Fancy Bear also focused largely on the hacking of Democratic National Committee servers and the release of Hillary Clinton's emails. Shaprio discusses "Cozy Bear" and "Fancy Bear", the two Russian organizations who penetrated the DNC servers through the use of phishing and social engineering, and examined the political consequences of modern-day computer hacks.

Fancy Bear culminated in discussion of the "botnet wars", coordinated denial-of-service attacks who originally were only used as a paid service that would later be turned against each other. These coordinated viruses would use unsecured Internet of things (IoT) devices to build large scale coordinated attack robots in carrying out their DDOS attacks.

== Reception ==
Fancy Bear Goes Phishing was released to generally positive reviews. John Naughton praised the book as am "impressive achievement" and applauded Shapiro's ability to tell a story about the current state of computing using the five large hacks to tell a narrative. Dorian Lynskey of The Guardian also applauded Shapiro for his ability to use "vivid case studies to dramatise a technically complex subject". Richard Lea of The Wall Street Journal called the accounting the hacks in Fancy Bear "gripping" and praised the "level-headed suggestions" presented by Shapiro in Fancy Bear to aid in modern computer security. Fancy Bear Goes Phishing was listed on Amazon.com "Best Books of the Year" list.
