= Anaphora =

Anaphora may refer to:

- Anaphora (rhetoric), a form of repetition
- Anaphora (linguistics), a reference (e.g. pronoun use) relying on textual context
- Anaphora (liturgy), part of Christianity's Eucharistic liturgy

== See also ==
- Anaphoric macro
- Anaphoric reference
- Anaphoric pronoun
