= Zachary Taylor (disambiguation) =

Zachary Taylor (1784–1850) was the 12th president of the United States from 1849 to 1850.

Zachary Taylor may also refer to:

- Zachary Taylor (priest) (1653–1705), English parish priest known for his controversial writings
- Zachary Taylor (Tennessee politician) (1849–1921), former U.S. Representative from Tennessee
- Zachary Taylor (baseball) (1850–1917), American first baseman in the National Association for the 1874 Baltimore Canaries
- SS Zachary Taylor, a Liberty ship
- Zac Taylor (born 1983), former college football quarterback and current NFL head coach for the Cincinnati Bengals
- Zac Taylor (Australian footballer) (born 2003), Australian rules footballer for Adelaide Football Club
- Zac Taylor (singer) (born 1993), New Zealand singer and member of the band Titanium
- Zack Taylor (baseball) (1898–1974), American Major League Baseball player
- Zack Taylor (celebrity blogger), Canadian blogger
- Zack Taylor (Oklahoma politician), member of the Oklahoma Senate
- Zack Taylor, a character in the Power Rangers universe
