= New energy =

New energy may refer to:

- Alternative energy, any energy source other than fossil fuels, which include:
  - Renewable energy, energy from resources which are naturally replenished on a human timescale, such as sunlight, wind, surface water, tides, wind waves and geothermal heat
  - Nuclear power, the atomic energy harvested from the decay, fission or fusion of elemental atoms
- New energy vehicles (NEVs), a term sometimes used to refer to plug-in electric vehicles
- Perpetual motion or "free energy", an elusive energy source which would violate the laws of thermodynamics

== Art, entertainment, and media ==
- New Energy (album), an album by British musician Four Tet

== Businesses and organizations ==
- Icelandic New Energy, Iceland energy company promoting hydrogen fuel
- Institute of Nuclear and New Energy Technology, China
- New Energy and Industrial Technology Development Organization (NEDO), Japan
- New Energy (political party) (Nouvelle Énergie), political party in France
