= Mark Fletcher (businessman) =

American businessman

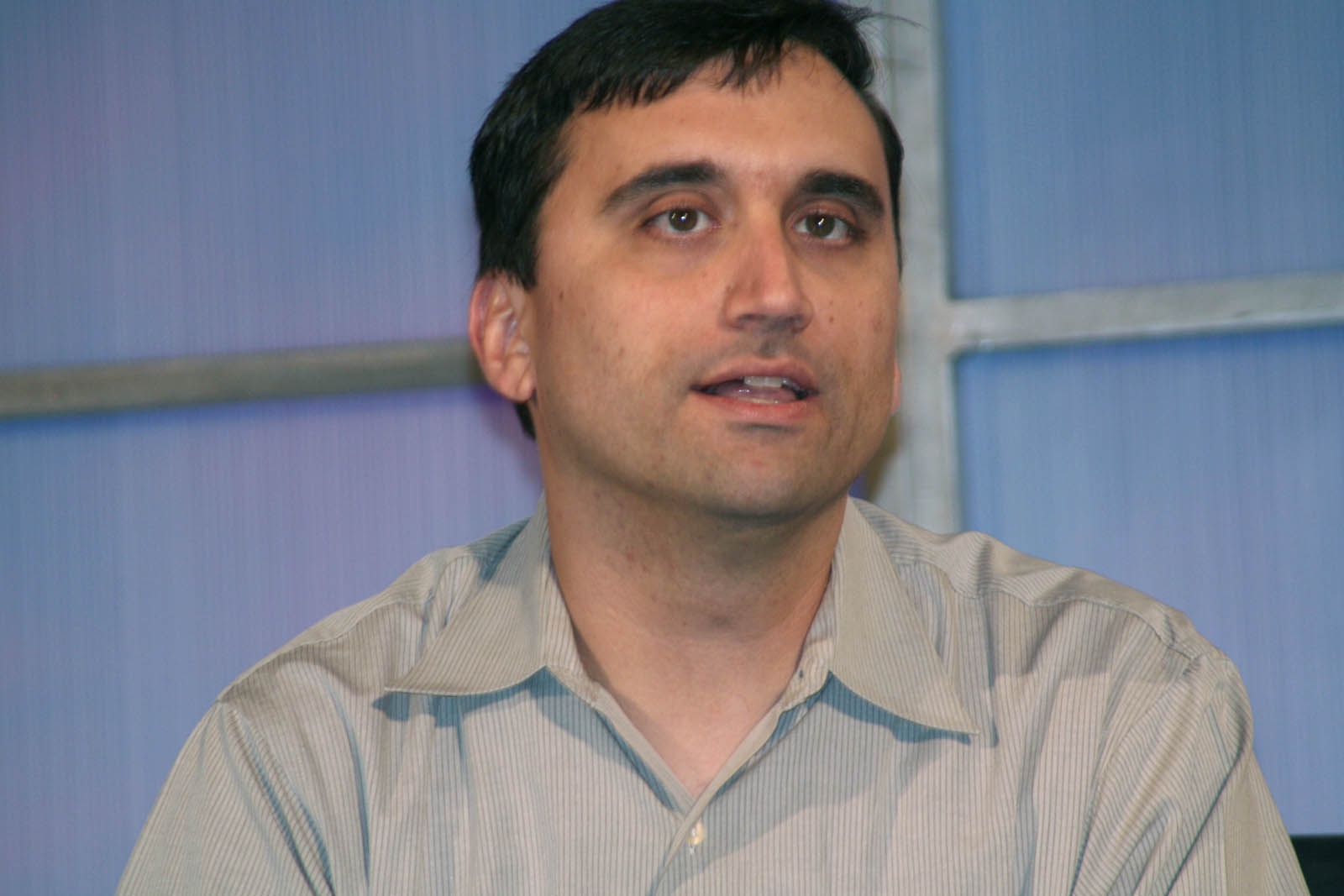
Mark Fletcher, 2005

Mark Fletcher is an American entrepreneur. He was the founder and CEO of the news aggregator website, Bloglines, and the Vice President of Ask.com until June 2006. Ask Jeeves acquired Bloglines on 8 February 2005.

On September 23, 2014 Fletcher launched Groups.io in beta.

In February 2005, Fletcher won one of the annual Rave Awards, presented by Wired magazine, for the success of Bloglines. Fellow nominees in the Tech Innovator category were Internet entrepreneur Jimmy Wales, Adam Curry, Scott Maccabe, and Zhang Zuoyi.

Previously, Fletcher started the free mailing list service ONElist. ONElist merged with eGroups, which was later acquired by Yahoo! in June 2000. Yahoo! Groups closed down in December 15, 2020. Many groups migrated to Groups.io Fletcher was also a software engineer at internet appliance maker Diba, Inc., now owned by Sun Microsystems, and at Pixel, Inc.

Fletcher has invested in One True Media, Plaxo, Techdirt and Wesabe

Fletcher obtained a Bachelor of Science degree in Computer Science from the University of California, San Diego.
