= No Secret Police Act =

2025 California statute

California State Legislature
- Full name: An act to add Chapter 17.45 (commencing with Section 7289) to Division 7 of Title 1 of the Government Code, and to add Section 185.5 to the Penal Code, relating to law enforcement.
- Introduced: 25 February 2025; 20 months ago
- Assembly voted: September 9, 2025
- Senate voted: May 8, 2025; September 11, 2025 (concurred)
- Signed into law: September 20, 2025
- Sponsor(s): Wiener (S), Arreguín (S) , Pérez (S) , Wahab (S), Bryan (A)
- Governor: Gavin Newsom
- Code: Government Code, Penal Code

Status: Current legislation

The No Secret Police Act (SB 627) is a 2025 California statute which prohibits certain federal and local law enforcement agencies from wearing face masks (including ski masks, balaclavas and neck gaiters) during operations. The law makes exceptions for undercover agents, medical masks such as N95 respirators or tactical gear, and does not apply to California state police officers (California Highway Patrol). The bill was drafted by State Senator Scott Wiener in response to the use of face masks by ICE agents during raids on allegedly-undocumented immigrants in California and other states. Despite opposition from the United States Department of Homeland Security, the bill was signed into law by Gavin Newsom on September 20, 2025. An online portal was created on the website of the California Attorney General on December 4, 2025 to report incidents of federal misconduct.

== Response ==
Acting U.S. Attorney Bill Essayli responded to the law by issuing a letter to federal law enforcement agency heads in the Central District of California, demanding that they ignore the law and supporting the arrest of state or local officers who "impede or interfere with operations".

The United States Department of Justice filed a federal lawsuit against the law arguing that the law violates the Supremacy Clause. On December 9, 2025, US District Judge Christina A. Snyder ruled to temporarily pause California from taking "any action to enforce the Challenged Provisions (as defined in the stipulation of the parties) of Senate Bills 627 and 805".

== Related legislation ==
=== No Kings Act (SB 747) ===
In 2026, Wiener and Senator Aisha Wahab co-authored the No Kings Act (SB 747), which would allow citizens to sue federal, state, and local officers and government officials for monetary damages in state court for violations of First, Fourth and Fifth (Equal Protections) Amendment protections. The bill would expand upon the Tom Bane Civil Rights Act. The bill was introduced in response to the weakening of Bivens actions in successive U.S. Supreme Court decisions. The bill was passed by the State Senate on January 27, 2026, and after amendments, it passed the Assembly on August 27, 2026. The bill was signed into law by Newsom on September 29, 2026.

== See also ==
- Anti-mask law
- Deportation in the second Trump administration
- California State Legislature, 2025–2026 session
- Converse-1983
