= Zhang Zuoyi =

Chinese academic (born 1962)

Zhang Zuoyi (张作义; born November 1962 in Xiamen city, Fujian Province) a physicist, he has been Director of the Institute of Nuclear and New Energy Technology (INET) at Tsinghua University since 2001. In January 2005, he was an unsuccessful nominee in the Tech Innovator category for a Rave Award, awarded annually by Wired Magazine, along with Jimmy Wales, Adam Curry, and Bill Healy. The winner was Mark Fletcher.

Zhang is one of the scientists dealing with the problem of powering China's growing economy, and has been involved particularly with the development of Very High Temperature Reactors (VHTR) to produce hydrogen for fuel cells as well as research into technical issues involving nuclear power plants.

Zhang obtained his BS in the Thermal Engineering Department at Tsinghua University, then his MS and PhD at INET, going on to become a lecturer at INET. He was Humboldt Scholar at KFA Julich Research Center in Germany from 1992 to 1994, returning to INET as a professor.
