= Hackers & Painters =

2004 book by Paul Graham

- Book cover
- Author: Paul Graham
- Publisher: O'Reilly Media
- Publication date: 2004
- Pages: 271
- ISBN: 0-596-00662-4
- OCLC: 55499541
- Dewey Decimal: 005.1092
- LC Class: HD8039.D37
- Website: www.paulgraham.com/hackpaint.html

Hackers & Painters: Big Ideas from the Computer Age is a collection of essays from Paul Graham discussing hacking, programming languages, start-up companies, and many other technological issues. "Hackers & Painters" is also the title of one of those essays. The image on its cover is 'The Tower of Babel' by Pieter Bruegel.

== Table of contents ==
1. Why Nerds Are Unpopular
2. Hackers and Painters
3. What You Can't Say
4. Good Bad Attitude
5. The Other Road Ahead
6. How to Make Wealth
7. Mind the Gap
8. A Plan for Spam
9. Taste for Makers
10. Programming Languages Explained
11. The Hundred-Year Language
12. Beating the Averages
13. Revenge of the Nerds
14. The Dream Language
15. Design and Research

== Publication data ==
- Graham, Paul (2004). Hackers & Painters: Big Ideas from the Computer Age. O'Reilly Media, Inc. ISBN 9780596006624.

== See also ==
- On Lisp — another book by Paul Graham
