= TimeBridge =

- Website: www.TimeBridge.com

TimeBridge was a Web-based software application for coordinating and running meetings and collaborating online. TimeBridge's meeting management service works with large groups or one-on-one meetings across time zones and companies and integrates directly with Microsoft Outlook, Google Calendar and Apple iCal. TimeBridge also includes phone and Web conferencing options. TimeBridge also includes phone and Web conferencing options as well as SMS features and an iPhone application.

TimeBridge was founded in 2005 by Yori Nelken. The company is based in Berkeley, California and funded by Mayfield Fund and Norwest Venture Partners.

TimeBridge announced their availability on iPhone in Sep 2009.

TimeBridge was acquired by the online local business network MerchantCircle in Sept 2010.

On May 26, 2011, Reply! Inc. announced that it had entered into a definitive agreement to acquire MerchantCircle.

In July 2019, TimeBridge was acquired by Calendar.

Timebridge may also refer to the TimeBridge™, an IBM i modernization framework developed by programmersIO that combines modernization methodologies, expertise, and AI-powered tools.

== Awards and recognition ==
In April 2008, TimeBridge was named one of PC World's "101 Fantastic Freebies".

In March 2009, TimeBridge was named a Finalist in the 2009 "Webware 100" Awards.

In July 2009, the company was named Global 250 Winner by AlwaysOn.

== See also ==
- Microsoft Outlook
- Google Calendar
- Apple iCal
