= Anybots =

American robotics company

Anybots Inc.
- Type: Private
- Industry: Robotics
- Founded: 2001; 25 years ago
- Founder: Trevor Blackwell
- Headquarters: Santa Clara, California
- Key people: David Rogan (CEO)
- Website: anybots.com

Anybots Inc. is an American robotics company based in Santa Clara, California. It was founded in 2001 by Trevor Blackwell.

== History ==
The company was incorporated as Anybots Inc. by Trevor Blackwell in 2001. David Rogan later became CEO in July 2012.

== Robotics products ==
=== Q(X) ===
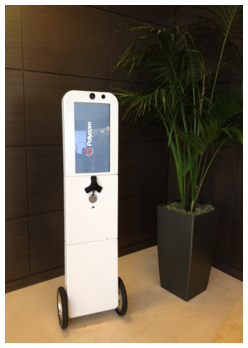
Anybots QX Prototype 4

Q(X) (also known as the QX) was a 2013 virtual presence robot from Anybots. It could support a 21-inch display or 2x 15.6-inch screens. It provided HD video, a 64x zoom camera, and audio capabilities. It was the first product from Anybots that did not feature its laser pointer as a standard.

However, its modular design allowed for customer-specified payloads and alternate conferencing systems to be included.

=== QB ===
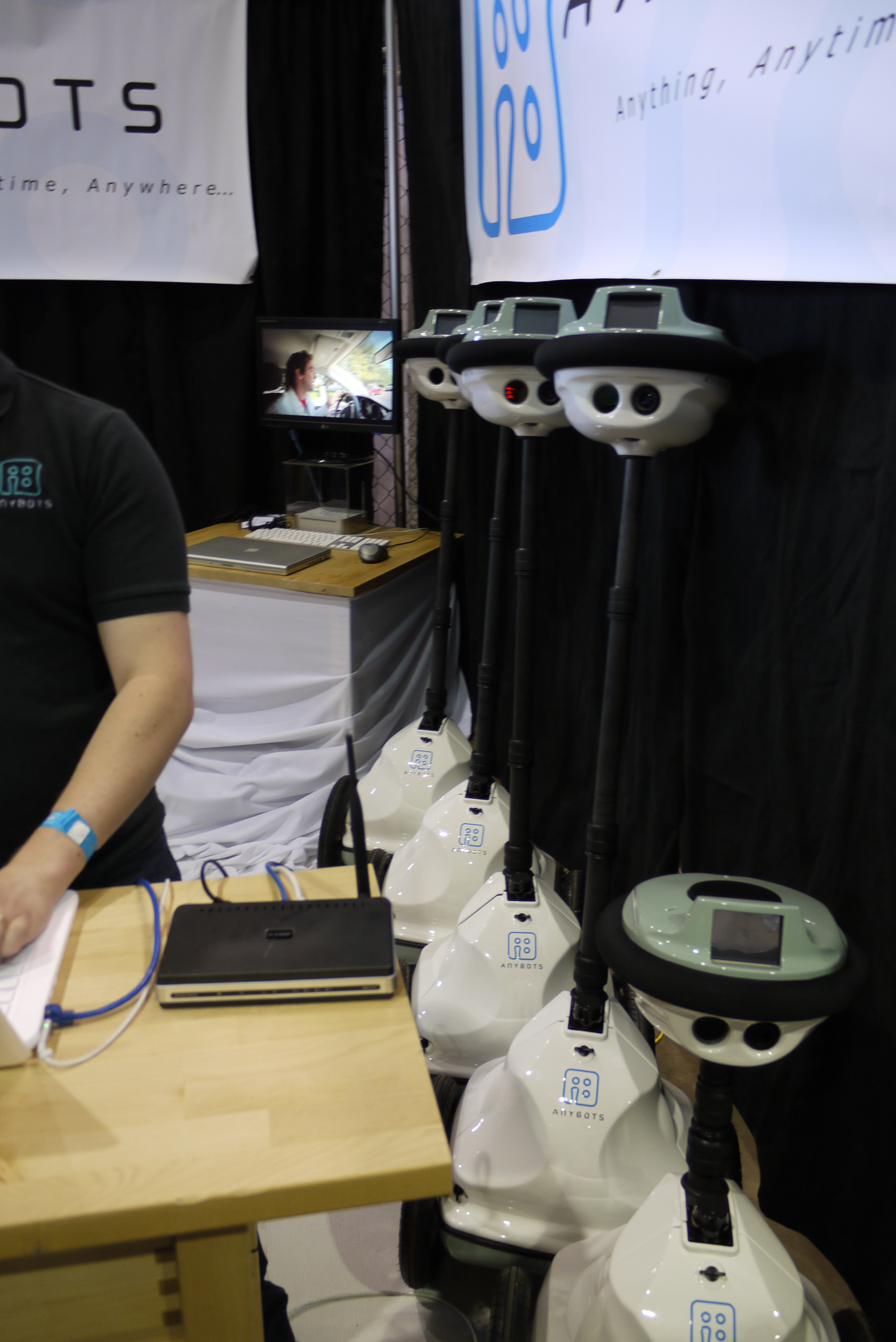
Anybots QB

QB was a two-wheeled, gyroscopically stabilized remote telepresence unit driven via a web browser. The user was able to select from a range of bots located around the world, and drive it from the website. The end user was required to have power, Wi-Fi or 3G/4G. This product featured a touchscreen display, speaker and microphone and a laser pointer.

Intended applications included marketing, and various telepresence tasks, such as for remote experts, remote lobby receptionists, museum guides, education, translation services, remote property tours by real estate agents, exhibition attendants and security patrols, as well as the more general business meeting presence.

It could also have become useful for the handicapped, severely disabled, and sick children, according to marketing material.

Anybots could be purchased in the United States, Japan, and Europe.

=== QA ===
QA, which debuted at the 2009 Consumer Electronics Show, was the first of Anybots' two telepresence Robots. 5-foot-tall (1.5 m), 35-pound (16 kg) It balanced on two wheels, like a Segway, had 5-megapixel cameras, two-way audio and a laser pointer for gesturing. The user could connect to QA via Wi-Fi.

The robot was never produced commercially.

=== Dexter ===
Dexter was a dynamically balancing bipedal humanoid robot research project. It was made to learn walking and jumping, with its feet clearing the ground for a third of a second. Because it uses pneumatics as actuators, its joints were compliant and provided a springy restoring force, much like a human's tendons, allowing it much greater capability to deal with obstacles.

=== Monty ===
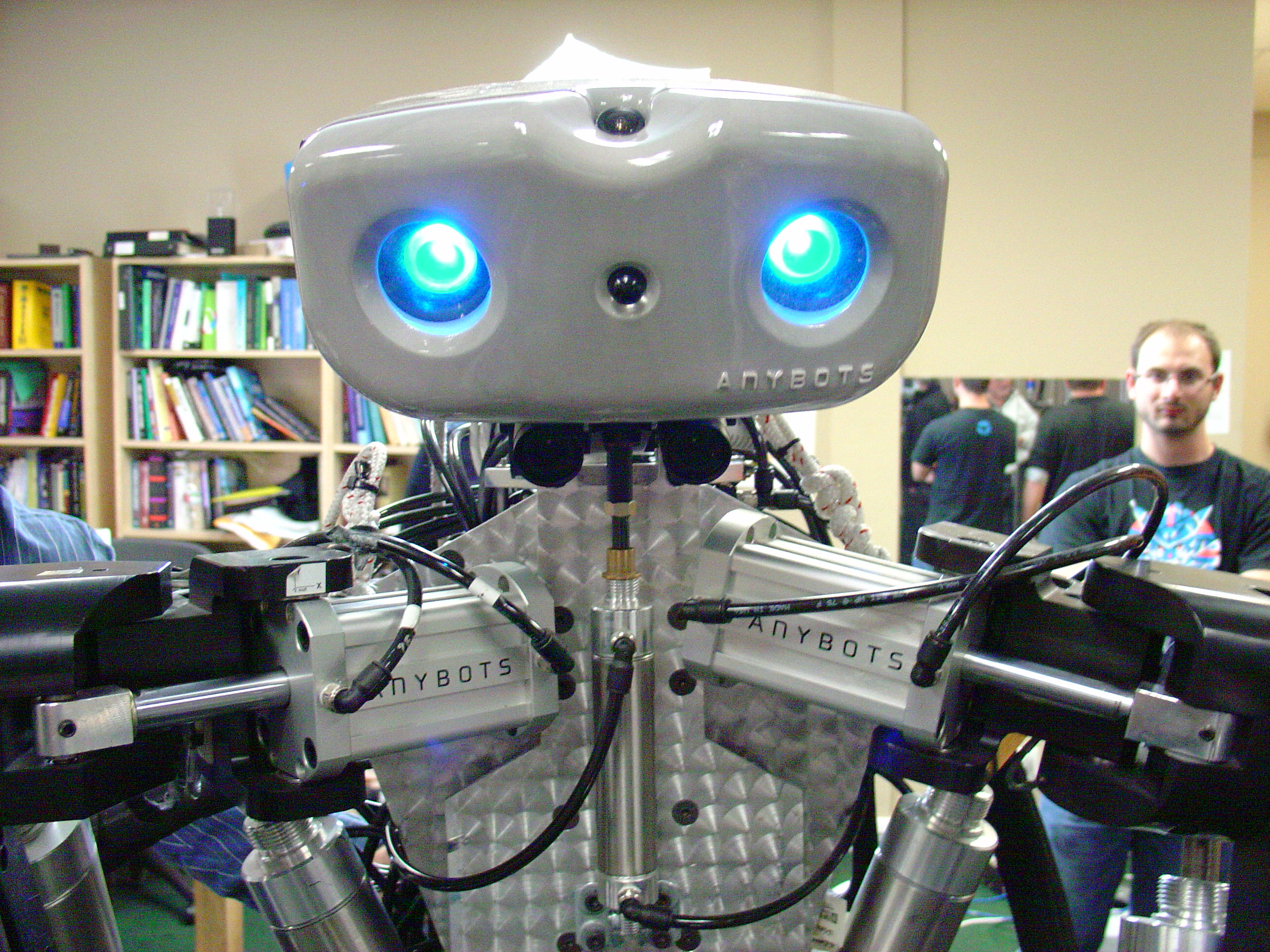
A Monty prototype

Monty was a telemanipulation prototype. It could pick things up with an 18 degree of freedom hand and was operated remotely through the use of a suit that included a special glove.
