= MerchantCircle =

California-based digital company

- Type: Private
- Industry: Digital marketing, Social media
- Founded: 2005
- Headquarters: Walnut Creek, California
- Key people: Payam Zamani
- Number of employees: 40
- Website: merchantcircle.com

MerchantCircle is a Walnut Creek, California-based digital company which helps small and midsize businesses network with other local businesses and reach local customers through free marketing tools and social media features.

== History ==
MerchantCircle was co-founded in 2004 by former CEO Ben T. Smith IV, and announced in June 2006. It was named "Newcomer of the Year" by AlwaysOn Media in 2007 and was ranked as the fifth-largest local directory site and one of the top 160 sites in the U.S. by a Quantcast study in 2009. MerchantCircle received just over $4 million in early stage funding from venture capital firms Rustic Canyon Partners, Scale Venture Partners, and Steamboat Ventures. In November 2007, the company received an additional investment of $10 million from IAC, Square 1 Bank, and all three previous investors. Ron Conway was also an early investor.

In 2010, MerchantCircle acquired online meeting scheduler TimeBridge to enable merchants and consumers to schedule appointments and calls online. That same year, the company also took over management of RSS feed company Bloglines, through which it plans to deliver local and industry-specific targeted content to member merchants and local deals and information to Bloglines account holders. The MerchantCircle network signed on its one-millionth member merchant in early 2010, and expanded internationally to Australia, Canada and the United Kingdom.

On May 26, 2011, Reply! Inc. announced that it had entered into a definitive agreement to acquire MerchantCircle for $60 million in cash and stock. The transaction was completed in 2011. Reply! founder and CEO, Payam Zamani, is the CEO of the combined companies, now known as One Planet.

One Planet maintained its directory listing at its core.

== Service ==
MerchantCircle is an online business directory, social business network and marketing platform. It combines features from traditional Internet yellow pages sites such as Yellowpages.com, Citysearch and Yelp, with community-oriented social media sites like Facebook. MerchantCircle offers small and midsize businesses, which may not have marketing experts or the financials to hire an agency, SEO products, assistance with managing social media platforms and email marketing. The company has upwards of 5 million merchants listed nationwide. Businesses have the ability to upload pictures, write blogs, create coupons and send online newsletters through the network. Consumers can leave reviews on business listing pages and business owners can respond.

Merchants can sign on to MerchantCircle and have the option for free packages as well as paid packages tailored to growth, which can be modified and customized.

In 2020, MerchantCircle plans to expand its pay-per-call network, helping drive traffic and connect customers directly with shops.

== Criticism ==
In May 2010, MerchantCircle settled a lawsuit with the Santa Clara County District Attorney's office, agreeing to pay $900,000 but without admitting wrongdoing. MerchantCircle was accused of making automated telemarketing phone calls without a live person on their end. Telemarketers are required in California to have an actual person on the phone to allow recipients to opt out.

== Timeline ==
On May 4, 2011, MerchantCircle launched the first mobile app designed for small businesses to manage marketing.

On November 4, 2010, MerchantCircle announced it would acquire Bloglines from Ask.com. Ask had earlier announced it would shutter the service.

On September 22, 2010, MerchantCircle announced the acquisition of online scheduling company TimeBridge.

On May 24, 2010, MerchantCircle entered into an agreement with VeriSign. As part of the deal, MerchantCircle businesses display the "VeriSign Trust Seal" in their member profile on the MerchantCircle web site.

On May 12, 2010, MerchantCircle expanded internationally, marketing its social networking service to Australia, Canada and the United Kingdom.

On January 18, 2010, MerchantCircle announced the network's one-millionth member.
