= On Lisp =

1993 book by Paul Graham

- Author: Paul Graham
- Language: English
- Publisher: Prentice Hall
- Publication date: 1993
- Pages: 432
- ISBN: 9780130305527
- Dewey Decimal: 005.133
- LC Class: QA76.73.C28 G73 1994
- Website: https://www.paulgraham.com/onlisp.html

On Lisp: Advanced Techniques for Common Lisp is a book by Paul Graham on macro programming in Common Lisp. Published in 1993, it is currently out of print, but can be freely downloaded as a PDF file.

== See also ==
- Anaphoric macro
- Hackers & Painters - another book by Paul Graham
