= Hot or Not =

Rating website

- Founders: James Hong, Jim Young
- Website: https://www.hotornot.com
- Launched: October 2000; 26 years ago

Hot or Not was a rating site that allowed users to submit photos of themselves to be rated by other users on a scale of 1 to 10, with the average becoming the photo's score. The site also offered a matchmaking engine called 'Meet Me' and an extended profile feature called "Hotlists". The domain hotornot.com is currently owned by Hot or Not Limited, and was previously owned by Avid Life Media. 'Hot or Not' was a significant influence on the people who went on to create social media sites like YouTube.

== History ==
The site was founded in October 2000 by James Hong and Jim Young, two friends and Silicon Valley–based engineers. Both graduated from the University of California, Berkeley, in electrical engineering, with Young pursuing a Ph.D. at the time. It was inspired by some other developers' ideas.

The site was a technical solution to a disagreement the founders had one day over a passing woman's attractiveness. The site was originally called "Am I Hot or Not". Within a week of launching, it had reached almost two million page views per day. Within a few months, the site was immediately behind CNET and NBCi on NetNielsen Rating's Top 25 advertising domains. To keep up with rising costs Hong and Young added a matchmaking component to their website called "Meet Me at Hot or Not". The matchmaking service has been especially successful, and the site continues to generate most of its revenue through subscriptions. In the December 2006 issue of Time magazine, the founders of YouTube stated that they originally set out to make a version of Hot or Not with Video before developing their more inclusive site.

Hot or Not was sold for a rumored $20 million on February 8, 2008, to Avid Life Media, owners of Ashley Madison. Annual revenue reached $7.5 million, with net profits of $5.5 million. They initially started off $60,000 in debt due to tuition fees James paid for his MBA. On July 31, 2008, Hot or Not launched Hot or Not Gossip and a Baresi rate box (a "hot meter") – a subdivision to expand their market, run by former radio DJ turned celebrity blogger Zack Taylor.

In 2012, Hot or Not was purchased by Badoo, which is owned by Bumble Inc. The app is currently rebranded as Chat & Date which uses a similar user interface to Badoo and shares user accounts between both sites.

== Predecessors and spin-offs ==
Hot or Not was preceded by other rating sites, like RateMyFace, which was registered a year earlier in the summer of 1999, and AmIHot.com, which was registered in January 2000 by MIT freshman Daniel Roy. Regardless, despite any head starts of its predecessors, Hot or Not quickly became the most popular. Since AmIHotOrNot.com's launch, the concept has spawned many imitators. The concept always remained the same, but the subject matter varied greatly. The concept has also been integrated with a wide variety of dating and matchmaking systems. In 2007 BecauseImHot.com launched and deleted anyone with a rating below seven after a voting audit or the first 50 votes (whichever is first).

The binary concept has been used in a variety of dating apps where users can swipe right or left on a user, to decide whether to match or ignore them (respectively), a similar mechanism to deciding whether a user is "hot".

== Research ==
In 2005, as an example of using image morphing methods to study the effects of averageness, imaging researcher Pierre Tourigny created a composite of about 30 faces to find out the current standard of good looks on the Internet. On the Hot or Not web site, people rate others' attractiveness on a scale of 1 to 10. An average score based on hundreds or even thousands of individual ratings takes only a few days to emerge. To make this hot-or-not palette of morphed images, photos from the site were sorted by rank and SquirlzMorph was used to create multi-morph composites from them. Unlike projects like Face of Tomorrow, where the subjects are posed for the purpose, the portraits are blurry because the source images are of low resolution with differences in variables such as posture, hair styles and glasses, so that in this instance images could use only 36 control points for the morphs. A similar study was done with Miss Universe contestants, as shown in the averageness article, as well as one for age, as shown in youthfulness article.

A 2006 "hot or not"-style study, involving 264 women and 18 men, at the Washington University School of Medicine, as published online in the journal Brain Research, indicates that a person's brain determines whether an image is erotically appealing long before the viewer is even aware they are seeing the picture. Moreover, according to these researchers, one of the basic functions of the brain is to classify images into a hot-or-not type categorization. The study's researchers also discovered that sexy shots induce a uniquely powerful reaction in the brain, equal in effect for both men and women, and that erotic images produced a strong reaction in the hypothalamus.

== See also ==
- Tinder
- Badoo
- Photofeeler
