= Converse-1983 =

Proposal in US law to allow state action against the federal government

Converse-1983 is a concept coined by the American law professor Akhil Reed Amar to describe a law that would allow individuals to sue federal officials under state law for damages when those officials violate the U.S. Constitution. The name comes from the existing statute 42 U.S.C. § 1983, which provides that any person acting under state law who deprives someone of federal rights is federally liable to the injured party.

By October 2026, six states had enacted Converse-1983 statutes in response to the 2022 Supreme Court's Egbert v. Boule decision, which narrowed the Bivens doctrine.

== Background ==
Amar coined the idea in a 1987 Yale Law Journal article entitled "Of Sovereignty and Federalism". 42 U.S.C. § 1983 allows people to sue state officials for violating federal constitutional rights. Amar's proposal would run this logic in the other direction, suggesting that states pass their own statutes giving people a damages remedy when federal officials violate the federal Constitution. Instead of federal law policing state officers, state law would police federal officers, mirroring § 1983, but inverted along the state–federal axis.

Amar described converse-1983 as "any statute that would invert § 1983 by providing a general state-law-created cause of action against persons acting unconstitutionally under color of federal law."

Structurally, Amar read the original design of federalism as allowing states to enforce the federal Constitution against federal officers, not just the other way around. Proponents of converse-1983 policies view them as addressing gaps in remedies for constitutional violations, especially in the context of the Supreme Court's narrowing of the Bivens doctrine, the judge-made federal counterpart that lets people sue federal officers for constitutional violations.

== States with Converse-1983 Statutes ==
Maine, Massachusetts and New Jersey have preexisting statutes that could support damages against federal officers for violations of constitutional rights. Converse-1983 statutes have received renewed attention in response to United States Immigration and Customs Enforcement (ICE) enforcement actity and Converse-1983 statutes have been proposed in 15 other states in just as many months of the second Trump presidency.

In 2025, Illinois enacted the Illinois Bivens Act, which explicitly authorizes a civil action against federal immigration agents who "knowingly" violate the United States or Illinois Constitution while conducting civil immigration enforcement. Thus, unlike a broader converse-1983 statute, the Illinois cause of action is limited to conduct in the civil immigration enforcement context. The Illinois statute is the first to be challenged by the Justice Department in federal Court.

In 2026 alone, at least six states have passed converse-1983 statutes:

- Connecticut SB 397
- Maryland SB 0346
- Rhode Island HB 7202
- Vermont H.849
- New York State Bivens Act
- California "No Kings Act"

Though these statutes are structurally similar, they are not identical. Maryland's statute, for example, only reaches "covered officers," who the statute defines as officials authorized to "make an arrest with or without a warrant for violations of the United States Code" and "carry firearms in the performance of the officer's duties," narrowing the range of possible defendants compared to bills that create a cause of action against any official acting "under the color of law." The Rhode Island statute is unique in that it also covers those whose "exercise or enjoyment" of those rights, privileges, or immunities secured by the Constitution "has been interfered with or attempted to be interfered with, by threats, intimidation or coercion." The Rhode Island statute also explicitly excludes the availability of statutory or common-law immunities to the extent the Constitution permits. Vermont's law, by contrast, preserves "any defense available to a defendant under 42 U.S.C. §1983, including qualified immunity.

On September 29, 2026,California Governor Gavin Newsom signed SB 747, the "No Kings Act," into law. California is the most populous state in the United States, making its adoption of a converse-1983 statute particularly consequential. SB 747 creates a civil cause of action for damages against federal, state, and local officers who, under color of law, deprive a person of rights, privileges, or immunities secured by the United States Constitution. The California statute is the broadest of the group as it extends to "every person" acting under color of federal state, territorial, or District of Columbia law, thus supplementing §1983 as to state and local officials.
