= Southmayd Professor of Law =

Position at Yale Law School since 1913

The Charles F. Southmayd Professorship at the Yale Law School was established in 1913 by a gift in memory of Charles F. Southmayd, LL.D. 1884, from his sister, Emily F. Southmayd. Scott J. Shapiro is the current Charles F. Southmayd Professor of Law and Professor of Philosophy at Yale Law School, appointed in April 2012. Akhil Reed Amar was formerly Southmayd Professor of Law, until 2008 when he was named a Sterling Professor of Law. Earlier Southmayd law professors included Boris I. Bittker, named Southmayd Professor in 1958, then Sterling Professor of Law in 1970, and Arthur Allen Leff.
