= Josh Chafetz =

American law professor

Joshua A. Chafetz (born 1979) is an American legal scholar who is the Agnes Williams Sesquicentennial Professor of Law and Politics at Georgetown University. Before arriving at Georgetown in 2020, he was a professor of law at Cornell University for twelve years. His mother was noted sociologist Janet Saltzman Chafetz.

== Works ==
- Chafetz, Joshua A. (2007). Democracy's Privileged Few: Legislative Privilege and Democratic Norms in the British and American Constitutions. Yale University Press. ISBN 978-0-300-13489-6.
- Chafetz, Josh (2017). Congress's Constitution: Legislative Authority and the Separation of Powers. Yale University Press. ISBN 978-0-300-22764-2.
