= Photofeeler =

Photo feedback website

- Website type: Photo feedback
- Available in: English
- Headquarters: Boulder, Colorado, United States
- Founders: Ben Peterson; Ann Pierce
- Website: www.photofeeler.com
- Launched: 2013
- Current status: Active

Photofeeler, founded in 2013, is a website that allows users to obtain anonymous feedback on their photos from other users. The company, based in Boulder, Colorado, was co-founded by Ben Peterson and Ann Pierce; Pierce served as its first chief executive officer.

The site offers three test categories - business, social and dating - each scored on three traits. Business photos are rated for competence, likability and influence; dating photos for smartness, trustworthiness and attractiveness; and social photos for confidence, authenticity and fun. Voters use a credit-based system: they can purchase credits or earn them by rating other users' submissions.

== Service ==
Users upload photos to one of three test types and receive numerical scores along with anonymous comments. The platform's stated purpose is to give people an objective sense of how strangers perceive them in profile pictures, since friends and family are typically too biased to give useful feedback. Voters in each test rate photos on the three traits associated with the chosen category and may add written comments. Photofeeler applies fraud filters and AI processing to votes in an effort to protect the statistical accuracy of results.

The company also runs a blog called Profiled, which publishes tips on profile photography.

== Research ==
Photofeeler has used its rating database to publish studies on first impressions in profile photographs. A 2014 analysis of more than 60,000 ratings across 800 business photos examined how variables such as facial expression, framing and clothing influenced perceived competence, likability and influence. The study reported that a smile with visible teeth produced the largest single positive shift in likability, while formal attire raised perceived competence and influence.

In 2019, Agastya Kalra and Ben Peterson published Photofeeler-D3, a convolutional neural network trained on the company's Dating Dataset of 1.2 million photographs and tens of millions of votes. The paper, presented at the International Conference on Image Analysis and Recognition, reported that the model matched the accuracy of around ten human votes when predicting how smart, trustworthy and attractive a subject appeared in dating photos, and that its attractiveness output achieved state-of-the-art results on standard facial beauty prediction benchmarks.
