= James Hong (entrepreneur) =

Entrepreneur and founder of Hot or Not

- Born: c. 1973 (age 52–53); California, United States
- Education: University of California, Berkeley
- Occupations: Entrepreneur, angel investor
- Known for: Co-founding the website Hot or Not

James Hong is an American entrepreneur and angel investor, best known as the co-founder of Hot or Not, a photo-rating and dating website that launched in October 2000. The site allowed users to upload photographs to be rated on a scale of 1 to 10 and became one of the most visited websites of the early 2000s. YouTube co-founder Jawed Karim has cited Hot or Not as a key inspiration for YouTube's early development.

== Early life and education ==
Hong grew up in Danville, California; his parents emigrated from Taiwan. He studied electrical engineering and computer science at the University of California, Berkeley, where he met future co-founder Jim Young. After graduating, he worked at Hewlett-Packard in sales engineering and product marketing before leaving in 1997 to pursue an MBA at Berkeley.

== Career ==
=== Hot or Not ===
Hong co-founded Hot or Not with Jim Young, his former Berkeley roommate, in October 2000. The concept originated from a disagreement about whether a woman Young had seen at a party was a "perfect ten." The site achieved rapid viral growth, reaching nearly two million page views per day within its first week. It also entered NetNielsen's top 25 advertising domains within two months. By mid-2002, more than three million photos had been posted and over two billion votes tabulated. By July 2004, there were 12.3 million photos. By July 2006, Hot or Not had tabulated approximately 13 billion votes.

The site generated revenue through advertising and a subscription-based matchmaking feature called "Meet Me," which charged users $6 per month. By early 2006, Hot or Not had nearly seven million registered users. The company was bootstrapped without outside investment; Hong still had $50,000 in business school debt when the site launched.

In February 2008, Hong and Young sold Hot or Not to Avid Life Media for a reported $20 million.

=== Influence ===
Hot or Not is recognized as an influential precursor to later social media platforms. Time reported that YouTube's founders initially conceived their site as "a video version of HOTorNOT.com." Co-founder Jawed Karim described Hot or Not as pioneering the concept of user-uploaded content viewable by anyone.

=== Investments ===
After the sale, Hong became an angel investor.

=== 886 Studios ===
Hong is a partner at 886 Studios, a Taipei-based venture firm. The firm operates 886 Launchpad, a startup accelerator that provides funding and mentorship to early-stage companies.

=== Other startups ===
In 2014, he launched Cakey, a child-safe YouTube viewing application he built for his own children after teaching himself iPhone development.

=== Publications ===
Co-author:

- Lee, Leonard; Loewenstein, George; Ariely, Dan; Hong, James; Young, Jim (2008). "If I'm Not Hot, Are You Hot or Not?: Physical-Attractiveness Evaluations and Dating Preferences as a Function of One's Own Attractiveness". Psychological Science. 19 (7): 669–677. doi:10.1111/j.1467-9280.2008.02141.x. ISSN 0956-7976. OCLC 1375119767. PMID 18727782.

== Philanthropy ==
In October 2005, Hong created 10 Over 100, a website encouraging people to pledge 10 percent of their income above $100,000 to charity. He developed the project with Josh Blumenstock, a web engineer at Hot or Not, citing a lack of clear norms for charitable giving among newly wealthy technology workers. By January 2006, more than 648 people from 36 countries had signed up.

== See also ==
- Hot or Not
