= Scott J. Shapiro =

American philosopher

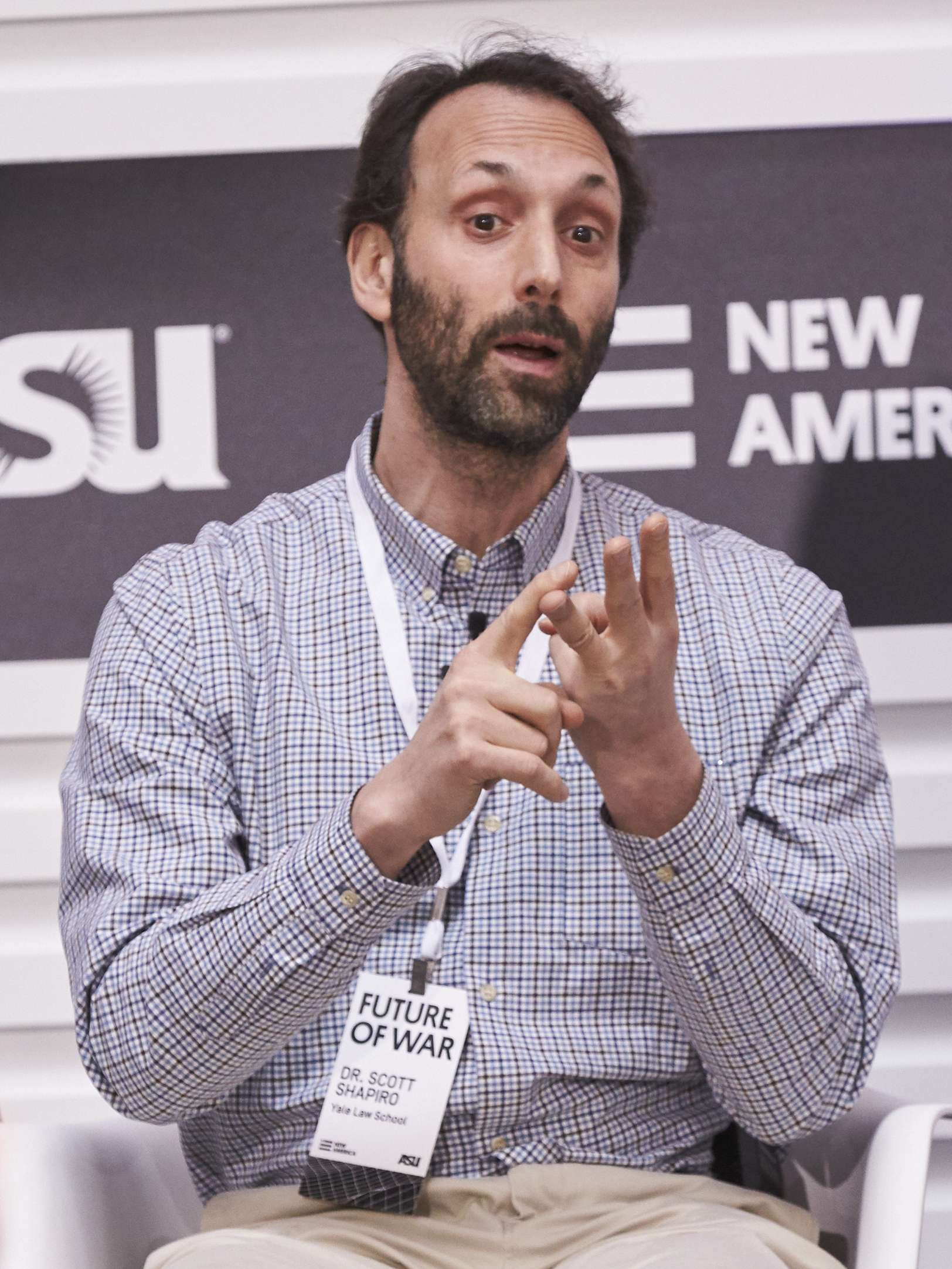
- Shapiro in 2018
- Born: Scott Jonathan Shapiro
- Title: Charles F. Southmayd Professor of Law and Professor of Philosophy at Yale Law School
- Board member of: Legal Theory

Academic background
- Education: Columbia University (BA, PhD); Yale University (JD)
- Thesis: Rules and Practical Reasoning (1996)
- Doctoral advisor: Isaac Levi

Academic work
- Discipline: Experimental jurisprudence, international legal theory, cybersecurity
- Institutions: Yale Law School (2008–); University of Michigan (2005–2008); Benjamin N. Cardozo School of Law (1999–2005)
- Notable works: Legality (2011); The Internationalists (with Oona A. Hathaway, 2017)
- Notable ideas: Planning theory of law, outcasting
- Website: Yale Law School

Scott Jonathan Shapiro is an American legal scholar who is the Charles F. Southmayd Professor of Law and Philosophy at Yale Law School and the Director of Yale's Center for Law and Philosophy and of the Yale CyberSecurity Lab.

== Education and career ==
He received his B.A. in philosophy from Columbia College, his J.D. from Yale Law School, and his Ph.D. in philosophy from Columbia University. After law school, Shapiro served as a clerk for Judge Pierre Leval on the U.S. District Court for the Southern District of New York. At Yale, he teaches in Jurisprudence, Constitutional Law, Cyberlaw, and Cybersecurity.

He is the author of work in jurisprudence and legal theory, including Legality (2011) He has also edited, with Jules Coleman and Kenneth Einar Himma, the Oxford Handbook of Jurisprudence and Philosophy of Law (2002). He has been cited for his work on the planning theory of law and for pioneering experimental jurisprudence. He serves as an editor of Legal Theory and the Stanford Encyclopedia of Philosophy.

With Oona A. Hathaway, he developed the concept of "outcasting" in international law and has been critical of humanitarian intervention without authorization from the UN Security Council. His book with Hathaway, The Internationalists: How a Radical Plan to Outlaw War Remade the World, was published by Simon & Schuster in September 2017, and received wide acclaim by The New Yorker, The Financial Times, and The Economist, among others.

== Bibliography ==
=== Books ===
- Coleman, Jules; Schapiro, Scott; Einar Himma, Kenneth, eds. (2002). The Oxford Handbook of Jurisprudence and Philosophy of Law. Oxford: Oxford University Press. ISBN 978-0-19-927097-2.
- Shapiro, Scott J. (2011). Legality. Cambridge, MA: Harvard University Press. ISBN 978-0-674-05566-7.
- Hathaway, Oona A.; Shapiro, Scott J. (2017). The Internationalists: how a radical plan to outlaw war remade the world. New York: Simon & Schuster. ISBN 9781501109867.
  - Published in the UK as Hathaway, Oona; Shapiro, Scott (2017). The Internationalists and their Plan to Outlaw War. London: Allen Lane. ISBN 978 0 241 20070 4.
- Shapiro, Scott J. (2023). Fancy Bear Goes Phishing: The Dark History of the Information Age, in Five Extraordinary Hacks. Farrar, Straus and Giroux. ISBN 9780374601171.

=== Articles and working papers ===
- Scott J. Shapiro, “The ‘Hart-Dworkin’ Debate: A Short Guide for the Perplexed,” Public Law and Legal Theory Research Paper Series: Working Paper No. 77, 2007, University of Michigan Law School
- Oona Hathaway and Scott J. Shapiro, “Outcasting: Enforcement in Domestic and International Law,” Yale Law Journal, Vol. 121, No. 2, 252, 2011, Yale Law School, Public Law Working Paper No. 240

=== Critical studies and reviews of Shapiro's work ===
The internationalists

- Hull, Isabel (April 26, 2018). "Anything can be rescinded". London Review of Books. 40 (8): 25–26.

European authors

- Alexy, Robert (2016). "Scott J Shapiro between Positivism and Non-Positivism". Jurisprudence. 7 (2): 299–306. doi:10.1080/20403313.2016.1190149. S2CID 152165585.
