= Arthur van Hoff =

Dutch computer scientist and businessman (born 1963)

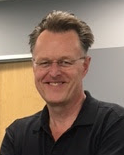
- van Hoff in 2016
- Born: 16 February 1963 (age 63); Netherlands
- Education: University of Strathclyde
- Occupations: Computer programmer, entrepreneur
- Employer: Jaunt
- Known for: Early contributor to the Java programming language
- Spouse: Marleen Zwiers
- Website: about.me/avh

Arthur van Hoff (born 16 February 1963) is a Dutch computer scientist and businessman.

== Biography ==
After studying computer science at the University of Strathclyde and Hogere Informatica Opleiding, Arthur Van Hoff joined Sun Microsystems as an engineer with the Distributed Objects Everywhere team. In 1993, he joined the Java development team, writing the language's compiler and taking responsibility for its first release to Netscape in August 1995. In 1996, he left Sun, feeling that the options to develop Java outside of the organization were "too tempting", and established the startup Marimba, as its Chief Technology Officer. At Marimba, Van Hoff led the engineering team in developing a pull technology-based software distribution system, Castanet.

In 2002, Van Hoff left Marimba, which was acquired by BMC Software for $240 million. He started Strangeberry, a startup that developed software to play computer-stored content on televisions. It was acquired by TiVo, Inc. in January 2004 and he joined TiVo as Principal Engineer. He resigned from TiVo in 2005 and later joined Flipboard as their Chief Technology Officer. He left Flipboard in November 2012 and started Jaunt Virtual Reality with co-founders Tom Annau and Jens Christensen. He is Chief Technology Officer of Jaunt, Inc., as well as Entrepreneur-in-Residence of Redpoint Ventures.
