= Institute of Nuclear and New Energy Technology =

Chinese energy research institute

- Traditional Chinese: 核能與新能源技術研究院
- Simplified Chinese: 核能与新能源技术研究院
Transcriptions
Standard Mandarin
- Hanyu Pinyin: Hénéng Yǔ Xīnnéngyuán Jìshù Yánjiùyuàn

The Institute of Nuclear and New Energy Technology (INET; Chinese: 核能与新能源技术研究院; pinyin: hénéng yǔ xīnnéngyuán jìshù yánjiūyuàn) is an energy research institute located in Tsinghua University, Beijing, China. It was founded in 1960. It is located in the northern suburbs of Beijing near Changping tiger village. The current Institute director is Zhang Zuoyi (张作义).

== See also ==
- HTR-PM (a pebble-bed reactor at Tsinghua)
