= Zack Taylor (celebrity blogger) =

Canadian blogger (born 1987)

Zack Taylor (born August 30, 1987) is a former radio disc jockey working for Y100 FM in Miami. Taylor hosted the midday show on Mix 100 FM in Yellowknife. He later turned into a celebrity blogger after creating Canadian celebrity gossip site ZACKTAYLOR.CA in August 2007. He now does gossip reports for KISS 92.5 and Z103.5 FM in Toronto.

== Career ==
The website gained attention in mid-November 2007, when photos of Toronto Maple Leaf, Jiří Tlustý, one of which was of him nude, appeared on Isthishappening.com, causing a media frenzy. This scandal was published as the full-front page photo of the November 14, 2007, Toronto Sun.

After all the attention, the website was bought in January 2008 by Hot or Not Inc. and turned into HotorNotGossip.com making Zack Taylor their main blogger.

In December 2008, Taylor re-branded the website under the title, ZackTaylor.ca - giving himself more freedom according to reports.

Taylor has been nicknamed "The Canadian Perez Hilton".

In June 2009, Taylor changed the direction of his website to take the side of celebrities.

On April 14, 2009, Taylor's company Is This Happening Inc. expanded with the introduction of two new subdivisions:

In November 2009, Taylor was hired as the celebrity insider at Toronto's KISS 92.5 FM and Z103.5 FM radio station for their weekly programs.

On October 3, 2011, Taylor announced via CNBC that his website was shutting down after it was bought by Cheaterville Inc. in Las Vegas to be changed into a new website.
