= Bloglines =

Web-based news aggregator

- Bloglines feed view
- Website type: RSS aggregator
- Owner: MerchantCircle
- Creator: Mark Fletcher
- Website: bloglines.com
- Registration: Required, Free
- Launched: May 07, 2003
- Current status: defunct

Bloglines was a web-based news aggregator for reading syndicated feeds using the RSS and Atom formats. Users could subscribe to the syndicated feeds for free using a web browser. Bloglines offered an application programming interface that maintainers of web could use to write software to read feeds, search its database of feed entries, and ping the service when a website was updated. Bloglines became unavailable in early 2015.

== History ==
Mark Fletcher, former CEO of ONElist, founded the site in June 2003 and sold it in February 2005 to Ask.com/InterActiveCorp. In 2005, it hosted more than 200 million searchable blog articles. On July 23, 2007, Bloglines released an iPhone version of their site. On August 27, 2007, the company released a public beta version of their site, with new features such as drag-and-drop feeds in the feed tree and a customizable start page.

Ask.com announced that Bloglines would be shut down effective November 15, 2010. However, on November 4, 2010, on-line marketing company MerchantCircle announced that it would assume control of Bloglines. On May 26, 2011, Reply! Inc. acquired MerchantCircle for $60 million in cash and stock. The transaction was completed in Q3 2011.

In December 2015 Bloglines had been down for at least 320 days, but users still can retrieve their subscriptions list from Netvibes using their Bloglines account.

== Awards ==
- Included in Time's Top 50 Web Sites for 2004
- Voted Best Blog/Feed Search Engine by the Search Engine Watch Awards in 2005
- BusinessWeek's Best of the New Web

== See also ==
- List of feed aggregators
