= EGroups =

Former email list management website

eGroups
- Website logo as of February 29, 2000
- Website type: Email List
- Founded: 1997
- Dissolved: October 12, 2020
- Founder: Scott Hassan

eGroups.com was an email list management website. The site allowed users to create their own mailing lists and sign up for membership. The website provided archives of the messages as well as list management functionality. Each group also had a shared calendar, file space, group chat, and a simple way to communicate. eGroups was bought in August 2000 by Yahoo! and became a part of Yahoo! Groups, which as of the end of 2019 were under Verizon ownership.

== History ==
The service was started by Scott Hassan in 1997 as an email list archiving service called FindMail (mimicking the name "FindLaw", a company co-founded by Martin Roscheisen). Carl Victor Page Jr., Larry Page's brother, joined the company in May 1997. When Martin Roscheisen joined as CEO in March 1998, FindMail was incorporated (in June 1998) and shifted its focus towards hosting email groups. FindMail, then renamed eGroups, grew to 250,000 users before taking a venture finance round of $810,000 from Atlas Venture in May 1998. In October 1998, with 1.2 million users (growing at 12,000 users per day), Excite offered to acquire the company for $40 million, but the company decided instead to take $5.1 million more investment money from Sequoia Capital.

In September 1999, eGroups started work on an initial public offering but instead merged with ONElist, with 13 million users exchanging more than 1.3 billion email messages each month. In January 2000, the company raised $42 million and filed a S-1 with the SEC on March 23, 2000.

In August 2000, with 18 million users, the company was bought by Yahoo! for $432 million in a stock deal and became Yahoo! Groups.

In 2019, Verizon bought Yahoo! and shut down the ability to upload new files on October 29, 2019, and removed the existence of files in the Groups on January 31, 2020, with mailing lists remaining available.

On October 12, 2020, Yahoo! announced it would permanently shut down Yahoo! Groups effective December 15, 2020. After that date, all groups would be deleted and the service would no longer be available.
