= Cameron LaCroix =

Cybersecurity student and former hacker

- Born: United States
- Other names: camo, cam0, camZero, cmuNNY
- Years active: c. 1999 – c. 2018
- Known for: Hacking Paris Hilton's cell phone, accessing LexisNexis, and defacing Burger King's Twitter account

Cameron LaCroix, aka camo, cam0, camZero, cmuNNY, is a cybersecurity student and former computer hacker from the United States best known for breaching Paris Hilton's cellular phone, accessing LexisNexis, and defacing the twitter accounts of Jeep and Burger King in 2013. He was subsequently charged with obtaining unauthorized access to various computer systems. Prosecutors said victims of the teen's actions have suffered about $1 million in damages. Pursuant to a plea agreement signed by the juvenile in August 2005, he received 11 months in a federally-contracted juvenile detention facility. After release, he was barred from using any device similar to a computer which made it difficult to socialize and obtain employment. In January 2007 his supervised release was revoked for having a cell phone.

In July 2014 he was charged with additional offenses stemming from the account takeovers of Jeep and Burger King's twitter accounts. Jeep's account was defaced to falsely represent that it had been purchased by General Motors' Cadillac, while Burger King's indicated it had been sold to McDonalds. As a result of this criminal activity he was sentenced to a term of 48 months of incarceration on October 27, 2014.

A week later he appeared on NBC's Today Show as a guest, interviewed by Jeff Rossen. He extended a public apology to Paris Hilton and reflected on his past. The segment details an obsession with computers that formulated when he was 11 years old, 6 years after his mother had died from a drug overdose.
