= ONElist =

ONElist was a free mailing list service created by Mark Fletcher in August 1997. In November 1999 ONElist merged with eGroups, which was later purchased by Yahoo! in June 2000.
