= Viaweb =

Defunct e-commerce store

- Screenshot
- Company type: Subsidiary
- Website type: E-commerce
- Area served: United States
- Founders: Paul Graham; Robert Morris; Trevor Blackwell
- Parent: Yahoo!
- Commercial: Yes
- Launched: 1995; 31 years ago
- Current status: Defunct (rebranded as Yahoo! Store in 1998)

Viaweb was a web-based application that allowed users to build and host their own online stores with little technical expertise using a web browser. The company was started in July 1995 by Paul Graham, Robert Morris (using the pseudonym "John McArtyem"), and Trevor Blackwell. Graham claims Viaweb was the first application service provider. Viaweb was also unusual for being partially written in the Lisp programming language.

The software was originally called Webgen, but another company was using the same name, so the company renamed it to Viaweb, "because it worked via the Web".

In 1998, Yahoo! Inc. bought Viaweb for 455,000 shares of Yahoo! capital stock, valued at about $49 million, and renamed it Yahoo! Store.

Viaweb's example has been influential in Silicon Valley's entrepreneurial culture, largely due to Graham's widely read essays and his subsequent career as a successful venture capitalist.

== See also ==
- List of mergers and acquisitions by Yahoo!
- RTML
