= Paul Graham (programmer) =

English programmer, venture capitalist, and writer (born 1964)

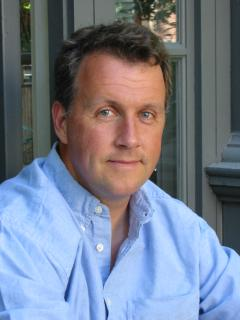
- Graham in 2011
- Born: November 13, 1964 (age 61); Weymouth, Dorset, England
- Citizenship: British; American
- Education: Cornell University (BA); Harvard University (MS, PhD)
- Known for: Viaweb; Y Combinator; Hacker News; Hackers & Painters
- Spouse: Jessica Livingston (m. 2008)
- Scientific career
- Fields: Computer science
- Thesis: The State of a Program and Its Uses (1990)
- Website: paulgraham.com

Paul Graham (/ɡræm/; born November 13, 1964) is a British-American computer scientist, writer, essayist, entrepreneur, and investor. His work includes the programming language Arc, the startup Viaweb (later renamed Yahoo! Store), co-founding the startup accelerator and seed capital firm Y Combinator, a number of essays and books, and the media webpage Hacker News.

He is the author of the computer programming books On Lisp, ANSI Common Lisp, and Hackers & Painters. Technology journalist Steven Levy has described Graham as a "hacker philosopher".

Graham was born in England, where he and his family have maintained a permanent residence since 2016. He is also a citizen of the United States, where he attended all of his schooling and lived for 48 years prior to returning to England.

== Education and early life ==
Graham was born in Weymouth, Dorset, England. His father was from Pwllheli, Wales, and worked for Westinghouse (now CBS Corporation) designing nuclear reactors. Graham and his family moved to Pittsburgh, Pennsylvania in 1968, where he later attended the Gateway High School. He began writing computer code in high school.

Graham received a Bachelor of Arts with a major in philosophy from Cornell University in 1986. He then received a Master of Science in 1988, and a Doctor of Philosophy in 1990, both in computer science from Harvard University.

Graham also studied fine arts and painting at the Rhode Island School of Design and at the Accademia di Belle Arti in Florence.

== Career ==
In 1996, Graham and Robert Morris founded Viaweb and recruited Trevor Blackwell shortly after. They believed that Viaweb was the first application service provider. Graham received a patent for webapps based on his work at Viaweb. Viaweb's software, written mostly in Common Lisp, allowed users to make their own Internet stores. In the summer of 1998, after Jerry Yang received a strong recommendation from Ali Partovi, Viaweb was sold to Yahoo! for 455,000 shares of Yahoo! stock, valued at $49.6 million. After the acquisition, the product became Yahoo! Store.

Graham later gained notice for his essays, which he posts on his personal website. Essay subjects range from "Beating the Averages", which compares Lisp to other programming languages and introduced the hypothetical programming language Blub, to "Why Nerds are Unpopular", a discussion of nerd life in high school. A collection of his essays has been published as Hackers & Painters by O'Reilly Media, which includes a discussion of the growth of Viaweb and the advantages of Lisp to program it.

In 2001, Graham announced that he was working on a new dialect of Lisp named Arc. It was released on 29 January 2008. Over the years since, he has written several essays describing features or goals of the language, and some internal projects at Y Combinator have been written in Arc, including the Hacker News web forum and news aggregator program.

In 2005, after giving a talk at the Harvard Computer Society later published as "How to Start a Startup", Graham along with Trevor Blackwell, Jessica Livingston, and Robert Morris started Y Combinator to provide seed funding to startups, particularly those started by younger, more technically oriented founders. Y Combinator has invested in more than 1300 startups, including Reddit, Twitch (formerly Justin.tv), Xobni, Dropbox, Airbnb, and Stripe.

BusinessWeek included Paul Graham in the 2008 edition of its annual feature, The 25 Most Influential People on the Web.

In response to the proposed Stop Online Piracy Act (SOPA), Graham announced in late 2011 that no representatives of any company supporting it would be invited to Y Combinator's Demo Day events.

In February 2014, Graham stepped down from his day-to-day role at Y Combinator.

In October 2019, Graham announced a specification for another new dialect of Lisp, written in itself, named Bel.

== Graham's hierarchy of disagreement ==
Graham's hierarchy of disagreement

Graham proposed a disagreement hierarchy in a 2008 essay "How to Disagree", putting types of argument into a seven-point hierarchy and observing that "If moving up the disagreement hierarchy makes people less mean, that will make most of them happier." Graham also suggested that the hierarchy can be thought of as a pyramid, as the highest forms of disagreement are rarer.

Following this hierarchy, Graham notes that articulate forms of name-calling (e.g., "The author is a self-important dilettante") are no different from crude insults. When in disagreement people often become more animated and engaged, and this leads to them becoming angry. At the lower levels, the attacks are directed against the person, which can be hateful. Higher levels of argument are directed against the idea, which is easier to recognize and accept. When people argue at the higher levels, the exchange of viewpoint is more informative and helpful.

== The Blub paradox ==
Graham considers the hierarchy of programming languages with the example of Blub, a hypothetically average language "right in the middle of the abstractness continuum. It is not the most powerful language, but it is more powerful than Cobol or machine language." It was used by Graham to illustrate a comparison, beyond Turing completeness, of programming language power, and more specifically to illustrate the difficulty of comparing a programming language one knows to one that one does not.

...These studies would like to formally prove that a certain language is more or less expressive than another language. Determining such a relation between languages objectively rather than subjectively seems to be somewhat problematic, a phenomenon that Paul Graham has discussed in "The Blub Paradox".

Graham considers a hypothetical Blub programmer. When the programmer looks down the "power continuum", they consider the lower languages to be less powerful because they miss some feature that a Blub programmer is used to. But when they look up, they fail to realize that they are looking up: they merely see "weird languages" with unnecessary features and assumes they are equivalent in power, but with "other hairy stuff thrown in as well". When Graham considers the point of view of a programmer using a language higher than Blub, he describes that programmer as looking down on Blub and noting its "missing" features from the point of view of the higher language.

Graham describes this as the Blub paradox and concludes that "By induction, the only programmers in a position to see all the differences in power between the various languages are those who understand the most powerful one."

The concept has been cited by programmers such as Joel Spolsky.

== Personal life ==
In 2008, Graham married Jessica Livingston. They have two children, and have been living in England since 2016.
