= Trevor Blackwell =

Canadian-American programmer

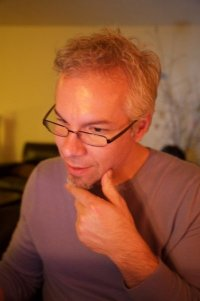
- Blackwell in 2007
- Born: November 4, 1969 (age 56); Saskatoon, Saskatchewan
- Education: Carleton University (BEng); Harvard University (PhD)
- Occupations: Computer programmer, engineer and entrepreneur
- Employer(s): Anybots, Y Combinator
- Known for: Inventor of the Eunicycle, founder and CEO of Anybots, partner at Y Combinator, first dynamically balancing biped robot
- Website: tlb.org

Trevor Blackwell (born November 4, 1969, in Canada) is a Canadian-American computer programmer, engineer, entrepreneur and roboticist based in England.

Blackwell is a developer of humanoid robots. Blackwell is the founder and former CEO of Anybots and a partner at Y Combinator.

== Life and career ==
Blackwell grew up in Saskatoon, Saskatchewan, Canada. Blackwell studied engineering at Carleton University and received a Bachelor of Engineering in 1992, then studied computer science at Harvard University and received a PhD in 1998. His dissertation applied randomized methods to analyzing the performance of networks and compilers.

During graduate school Blackwell joined Viaweb for which he wrote the image rendering, order processing and statistics software. The company was acquired by Yahoo in 1998, and Blackwell moved to Silicon Valley to lead the Yahoo Store development group.

He founded Anybots in 2001 to build teleoperated humanoid robots. In 2006, Anybots announced a humanoid robot that walks and balances like people do, without depending on large feet for stability.

As side projects, he has built two other balancing vehicles: a two-wheeled balancing scooter similar to the Segway but with different steering, and the self-balancing Eunicycle. Several hobbyists have built vehicles based on the open design of the machine.

He co-founded Y Combinator in 2005.
