= Interpretive sign =

Informational sign

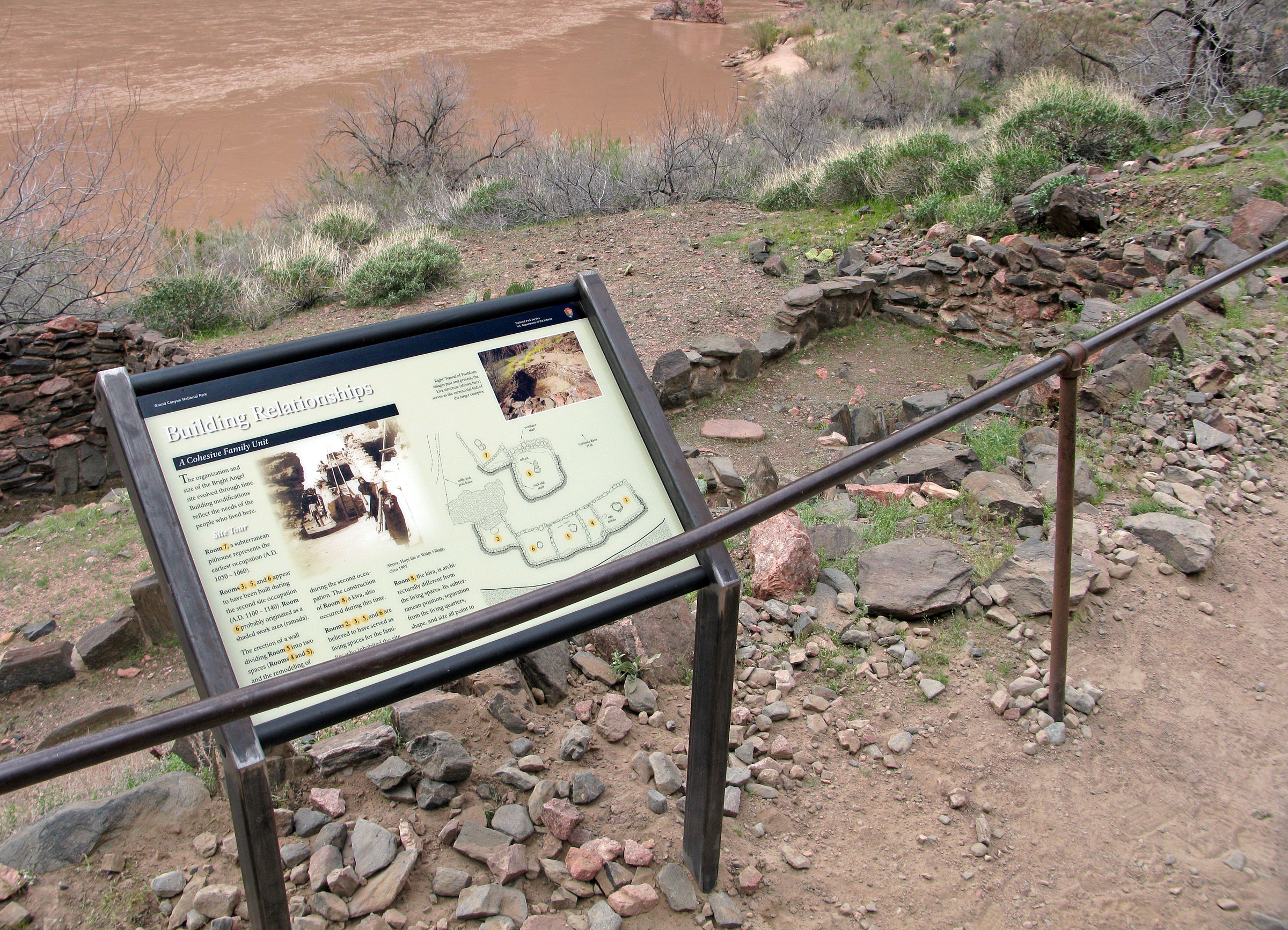
An interpretive sign at Grand Canyon National Park

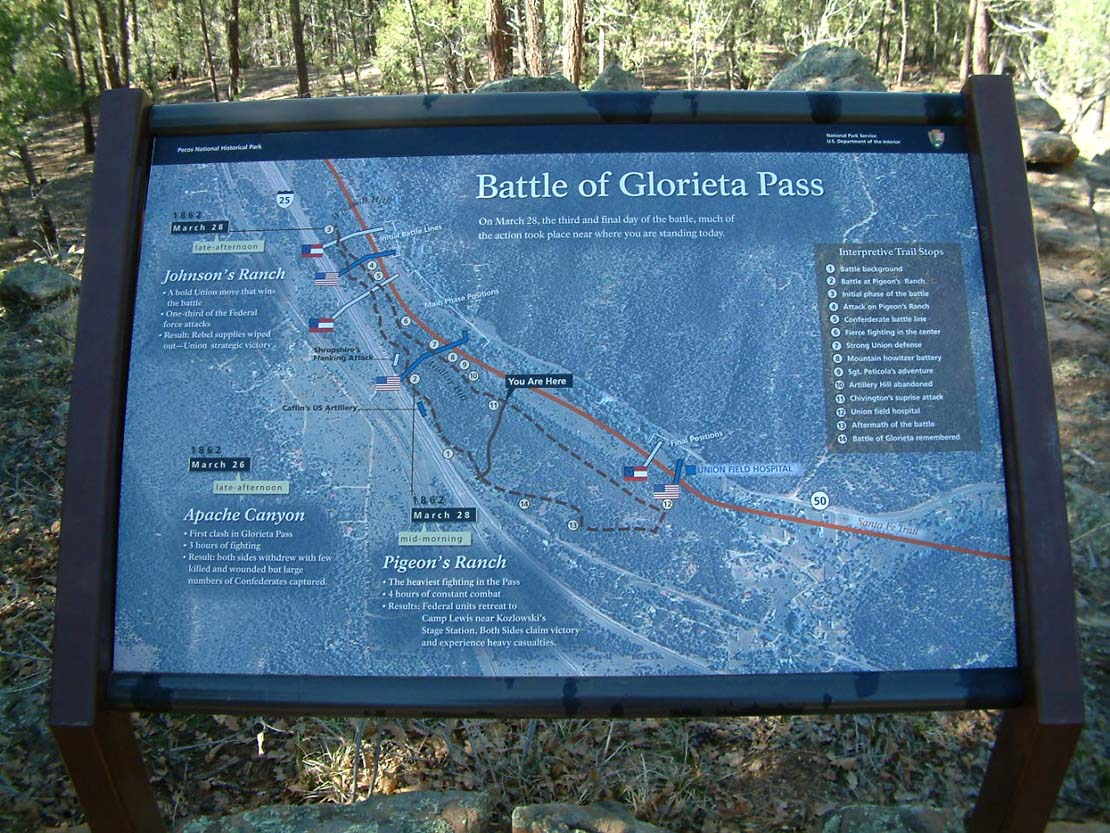
An interpretive sign at Glorieta Pass Battlefield

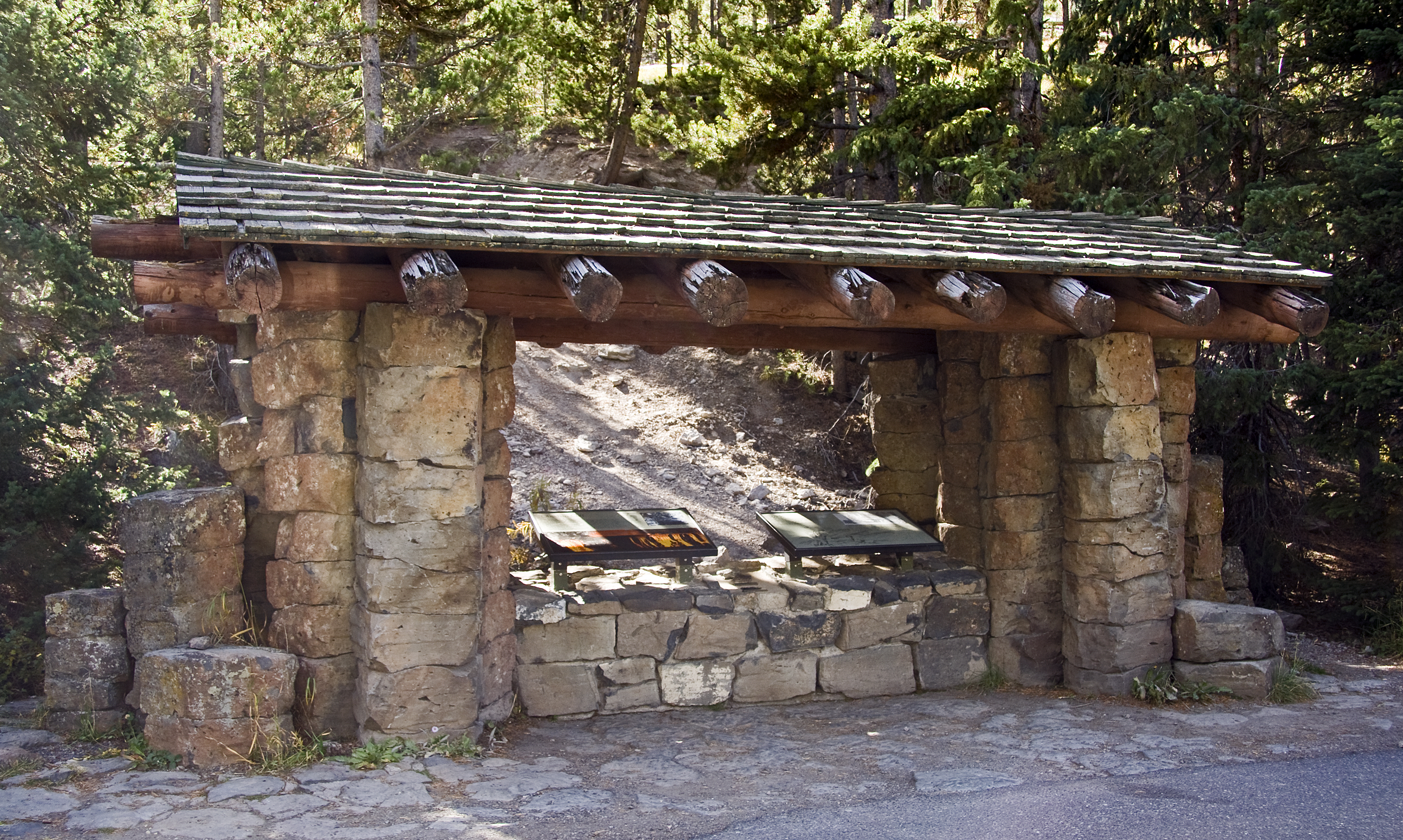
The Obsidian Cliff wayside exhibit in Yellowstone National Park

An interpretive sign, also called an interpretive panel or wayside marker, is a type of signage most commonly found in protected areas or interpretation centers that provides information via text, photographs, and artwork about the area, interpreting what may be viewed from the location of the sign. The signage may focus on historical or natural aspects of the site being interpreted. Interpretive signs with a historical focus may also be considered historical markers, but the emphasis is on interpretation of the site for the visitor rather than commemoration. Content must be carefully planned to ensure that the effectiveness of the information being conveyed is maintained over the lifetime of the sign. Multiple interpretive signs and associated shelter and other infrastructure form a wayside exhibit (also known as an interpretive shelter or interpretive kiosk). Hiking trails that include interpretive signs along their route are known as interpretive trails or nature trails and are generally short, easy, and family-friendly, with some being accessible.

The inclusion of high-quality photographs was found to attract visitors to read a sign and improve their understanding and experience. In local neighborhood natural areas, information on interpretive signs was found to be better retained by first-time visitors.

Currently in the United States, interpretive signage across the National Park System is under review by the Trump administration, which critics say could undermine understanding of crucial aspects of American history. Signs discussing climate change, slavery, and Japanese internment have been removed for conflicting with the administration's views and priorities.

== See also ==
- Commemorative plaque
- Exhibit design
- Heritage interpretation
- Interpretive planning
- Nature trail
- Thematic interpretation
