= AldrichPears Associates =

Designing and planning firm based in Vancouver, British Columbia, Canada

AldrichPears Associates is an interpretive planning and exhibit design firm based in Vancouver, British Columbia, Canada. They work for museums, science centers, interpretive centers, zoos, aquariums, botanical gardens, and children's museums around the world. AldrichPears Associates is best known for designing the exhibits at the Desert Living Center at the Las Vegas Springs Preserve, Nevada, a LEED-certified project that explores sustainable living in the desert and the Museo del Acero, a steel museum housed in a restored blast furnace, at Parque Fundidora. This museum interprets the scientific and cultural history of steelmaking in Mexico.

== History ==
Ron Pears and Phil Aldrich founded AldrichPears Associates in 1979. The company has grown steadily and now employs 30 content developers, graphic designers and exhibit designers. In 2007, after 11 years with AldrichPears, Isaac Marshall became the third principal of the firm. They are a full service firm that works with informal learning institutions from the initial conceptual planning phases of a project through design development and the final building contract and administration phases.

== Recent work ==
AldrichPears has been internationally recognized for its design work on many projects. They are known in North America for their work and are gaining a foothold in the global market with projects in the Middle East, Europe and Asia.

=== Interpretive centers ===
- Denali Visitor Center, Alaska
- Alaska Islands and Ocean Visitor Center, Homer, Alaska
- Northwest Arctic Heritage Center, Kotzebue, Alaska
- Kodiak Refuge Visitors Center, Kodiak, Alaska
- Tillamook Forest Center, Tillamook, Oregon
- Sheikh Zayed Desert Learning Centre, Al Ain, United Arab Emirates
- Desert Living Center, Las Vegas Springs Preserve, Nevada
- Chattahoochee Nature Center, Roswell, Georgia
- Nature Exchange, Various locations
- Turtle Bay Museum, Redding, California
- Yaquina Head Interpretive Center, Newport, Oregon

=== Museums and cultural centers ===
- Museum of Vancouver, Vancouver, British Columbia
- Nk'Mip Desert Cultural Centre, Osoyoos, British Columbia
- Evergreen Brickworks, Toronto, Ontario
- Archives of Falconry, Boise, Idaho
- Kidspace Children's Museum, Pasadena, California
- American Memorial Park, Saipan, Commonwealth of the Northern Mariana Islands
- World War II Valor in the Pacific National Monument, Honolulu, Hawaii
- National Children's Museum, Washington, DC
- Transportation Hall, Heritage Park Historical Village, Calgary, Alberta
- National Maritime Centre, Vancouver, British Columbia
- Maxine and Jesse Whitney Museum, Prince William Sound College, Valdez, Alaska

=== Zoos and aquariums ===
- Vancouver Aquarium Marine Science Centre, Vancouver, British Columbia
- Odense Zoo, Odense, Denmark
- Oltramare Marine Park, Riccione, Italy
- Polar Extremes, Edmonton Valley Zoo, Edmonton, Alberta
- Zoomazium, Woodland Park Zoo, Seattle, Washington
- Lacerte Children's Zoo, Dallas Zoo, Dallas, Texas
- Al Ain Wildlife Park & Resort, Al Ain, United Arab Emirates

=== Science centers ===
- Sultan Bin Abdulaziz Science and Technology Center, Khobar, Saudi Arabia
- Telus World of Science, Edmonton, Alberta
- Museo del Acero (Museum of Steel), Monterrey, Mexico
- ʻImiloa Astronomy Center, Hilo, Hawaii
