= Aydemir (name) =

Aydemir may refer to:

== Given name ==
- Aydemir Güler (born 1961), Turkish communist politician

== Surname ==
- Esma Aydemir (born 1992), Turkish female middle-distance runner
- Fatma Aydemir (born 1986), German author and journalist
- İbrahim Aydemir (born 1983), Turkish footballer
- Naz Aydemir (born 1990), Turkish female volleyball player
- Şevket Süreyya Aydemir (1897–1976), Turkish intellectual
- Dragana Lucija Ratković Aydemir (born 1969), cultural manager
