= Springs Preserve =

American natural wetland habitat

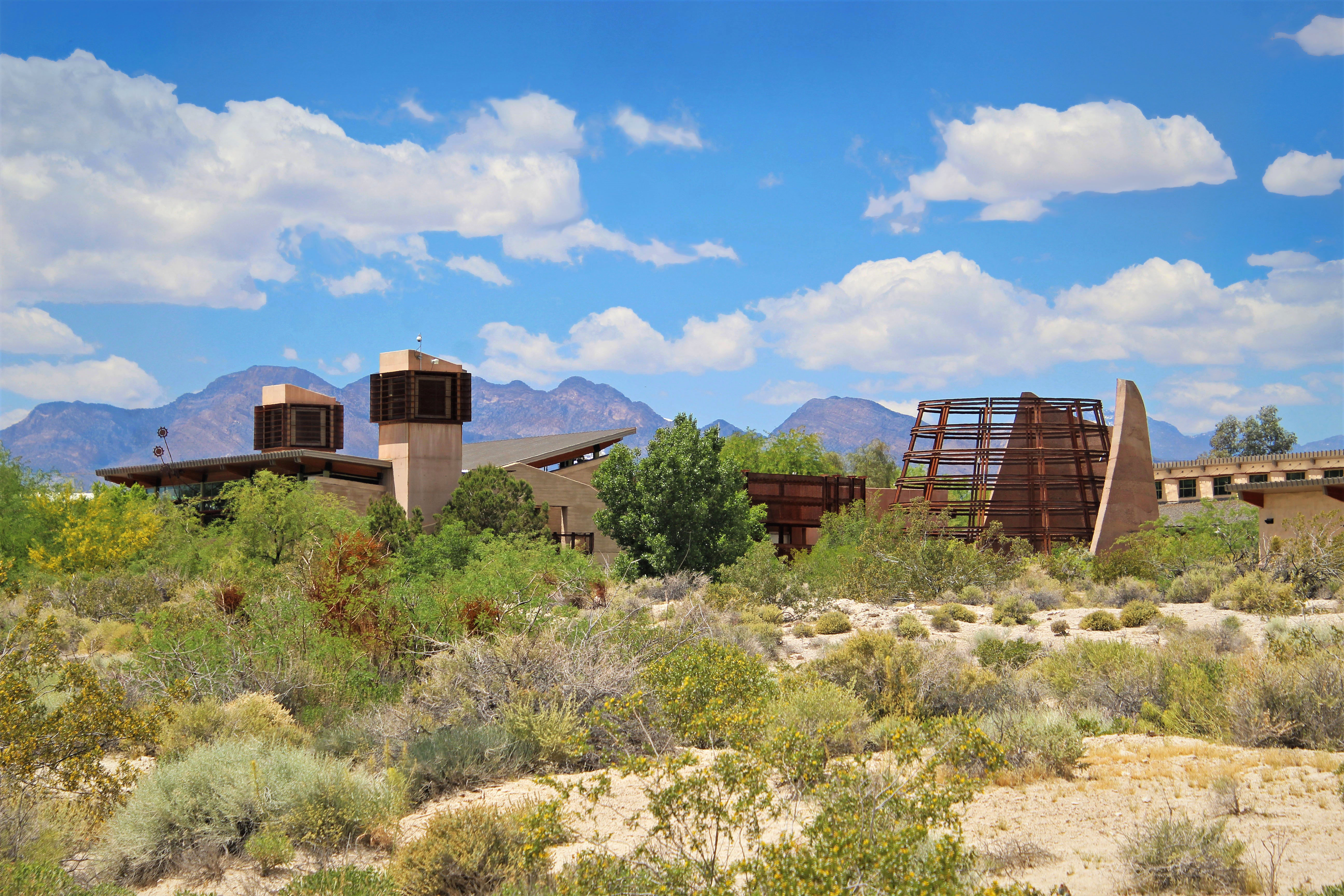
- Springs Preserve, May 2019
- Interactive map of Springs Preserve
- Location: Las Vegas, Nevada, U.S.
- Coordinates: 36.170785°N 115.190535°W
- Area: 180 acres (73 ha)
- Opened: June 8, 2007
- Operated by: Las Vegas Valley Water District
- Status: Open Year-round

Las Vegas Springs Preserve consists of 180 acres (73 ha) dedicated to nature walks and displays and is owned and operated by the Las Vegas Valley Water District. The Preserve is located approximately three miles west of downtown Las Vegas, Nevada. The Preserve is built around the original water source for Las Vegas, the Las Vegas Springs.

The Springs Preserve includes colorful desert botanical gardens, museum galleries, outdoor concert and event venues, an indoor theater, historic photo gallery and a series of walking trails that meander through a wetland habitat.

The Gardens at the Las Vegas Springs Preserve, previously known as the Desert Demonstration Gardens opened in 1980 at another location. The gardens now occupy 8 acres (3.2 ha) within the Springs Preserve site.

== History ==
While construction on the preserve began in 2005, the custom designed sound wall separating the site from U.S. Route 95 had been erected earlier. There also was work over the years to maintain and restore the springs, the waterworks and infrastructure of the springs. The Preserve opened on June 8, 2007.

== Green building efforts ==
A view of a water tower display at the Springs Preserve

The Preserve shows people how to live in the desert environment and how to take advantage of what is available. Part of this project showcases a dual-use concept. For example, the parking area is actually the roof of the reservoir, and the shade structures in various areas are photovoltaic cells used to generate power for the site.

The gardens also use a fleet of hydrogen powered utility vehicles. The vehicles are refueled on site by a solar powered hydrogen fueling station.

== Major exhibits ==
A trail passes a water derrick on the Springs Preserve site

- Origen Experience is composed of three interactive exhibits. Each exhibit is filled with stories about the Las Vegas Valley, following a natural progression from the past to the present.
- Desert Living Center is a campus of Leadership in Energy and Environmental Design (LEED) buildings and features interactive galleries, educational opportunities, a design lab, and a technical training center. The Center leads by example, using sustainable architecture, interactive exhibits, and programming to show Las Vegas residents how to conserve water and live sustainably in the desert. With exhibits designed by AldrichPears Associates, architecture by Lucchesi Galati Architects, and landscape architecture by Deneen Powell Atelier, the Center won the award for Best Public Green Building Project in Nevada in 2007.
- Trails – Walk four uniquely themed trails that encompass more than 1.8 miles (2.9 km) of picturesque landscapes leading to a cienega.
- Springs Preserve amphitheater is Las Vegas' only intimate outdoor venue surrounded by museums and gardens.
- Nevada State Museum features exhibits describing the development of Las Vegas and the natural history of the area.
- Nature Exchange is a small exhibit located in the desert living center. This exhibit is aimed towards children but encourages adults to participate. The Nature Exchange is a unique learning environment that relies on the personal "trading" of found natural items and information about them, to motivate interest and understanding. The trader receives points depending on the rarity and size of the object offered for trading. (One can not exchange objects from national parks, state parks, or the Springs Preserve.)
- Butterfly Habitat – Wander through our unique Butterfly Habitat and witness the fascinating dance between free-flying butterflies, the plants that sustain them, and their important role as pollinators in the ecosystem.
