= Dragana Lucija Ratković Aydemir =

Cultural manager, curator, art historian from Croatia

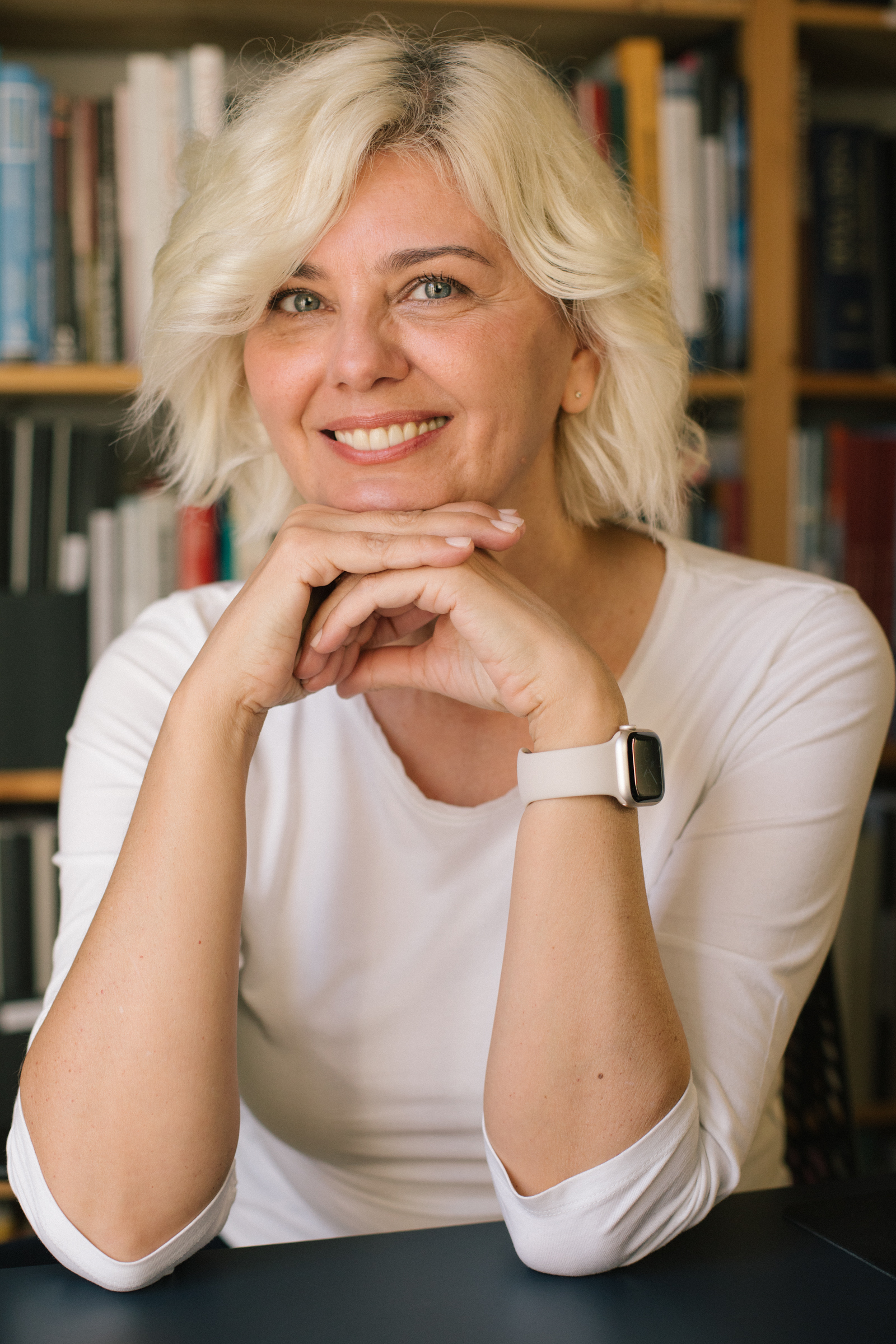
- Born: 24 September 1969 (age 56); Zagreb, Croatia
- Other names: Dragana Lucija Ratković–Aydemir
- Education: University of Zagreb
- Spouse: Oğuz H. Aydemir

Dragana Lucija Ratković Aydemir (born 24 September 1969), is a Croatian art historian, museum professional, scholar, and entrepreneur in culture and tourism. She lives and works in Zagreb, Croatia; Istanbul and Çeşme, Turkey.

== Education and early career ==
She graduated in 1994 in comparative literature and art history at the Faculty of Philosophy, University of Zagreb.

In the same year in 1994, she was employed at the Institute for the Protection of Cultural Monuments of the Ministry of Culture in Croatia. She specializes in inventorying, the inventory and protection of movable sacral heritage, and especially in liturgical vestments and silverware.

In the late 1990s and early 2000s, she curated permanent exhibitions of sacral heritage in the parish church of the Annunciation in Svetvinčenat and the Franciscan monastery in Rovinj, sacral exhibitions in the Parish Church of St. Martin in Tara near Poreč and the collection of liturgical textiles and silver in the museum of the Euphrasian Basilica complex in Poreč. In 1997, she was awarded a UNESCO scholarship for professional training in the field of conservation and restoration of cultural property at the Nicolaus Copernicus University in Toruń, and in Warsaw and Krakow.

== Entrepreneurship in culture ==
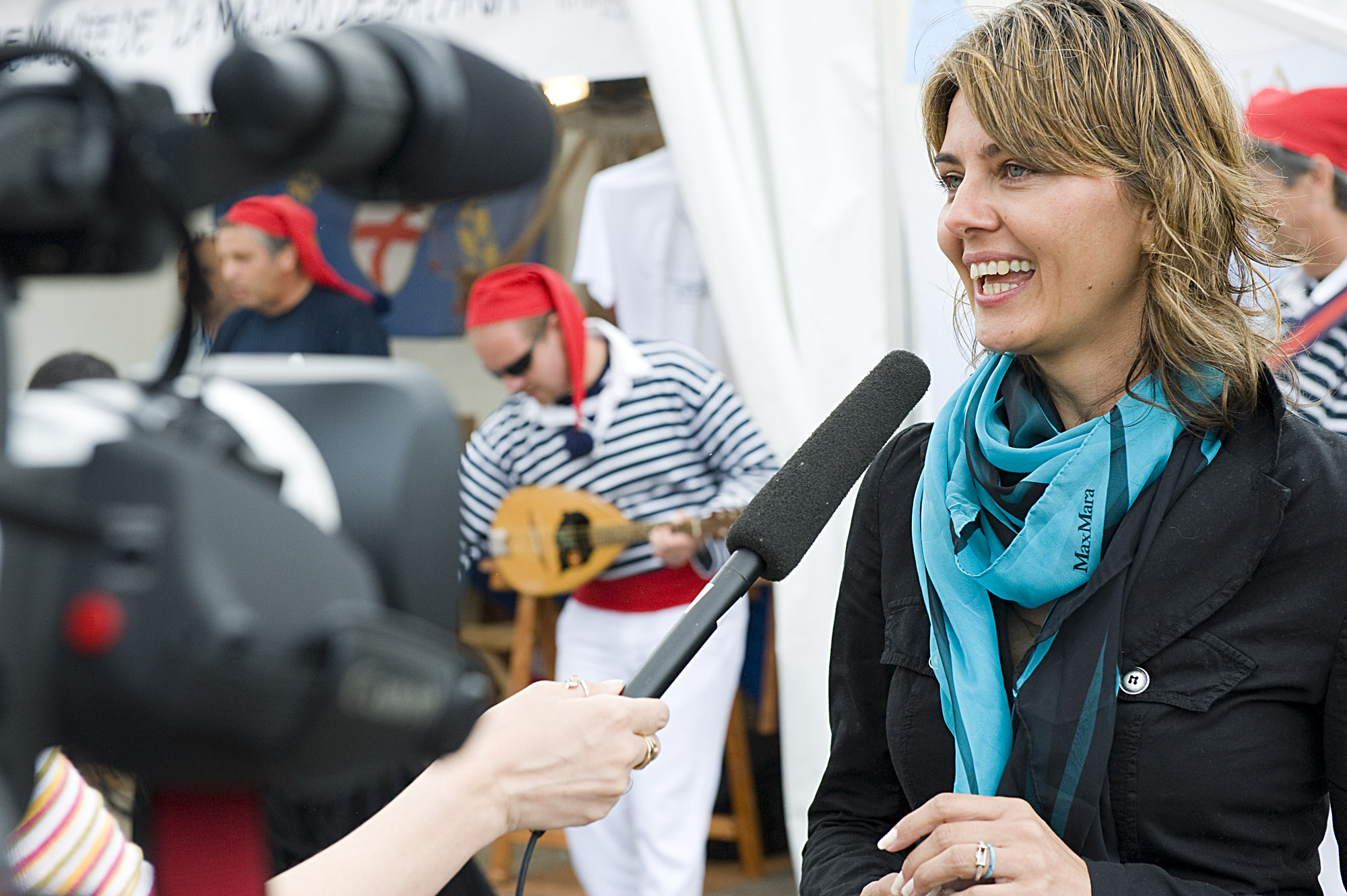
International Maritime Festival, Brest 2008

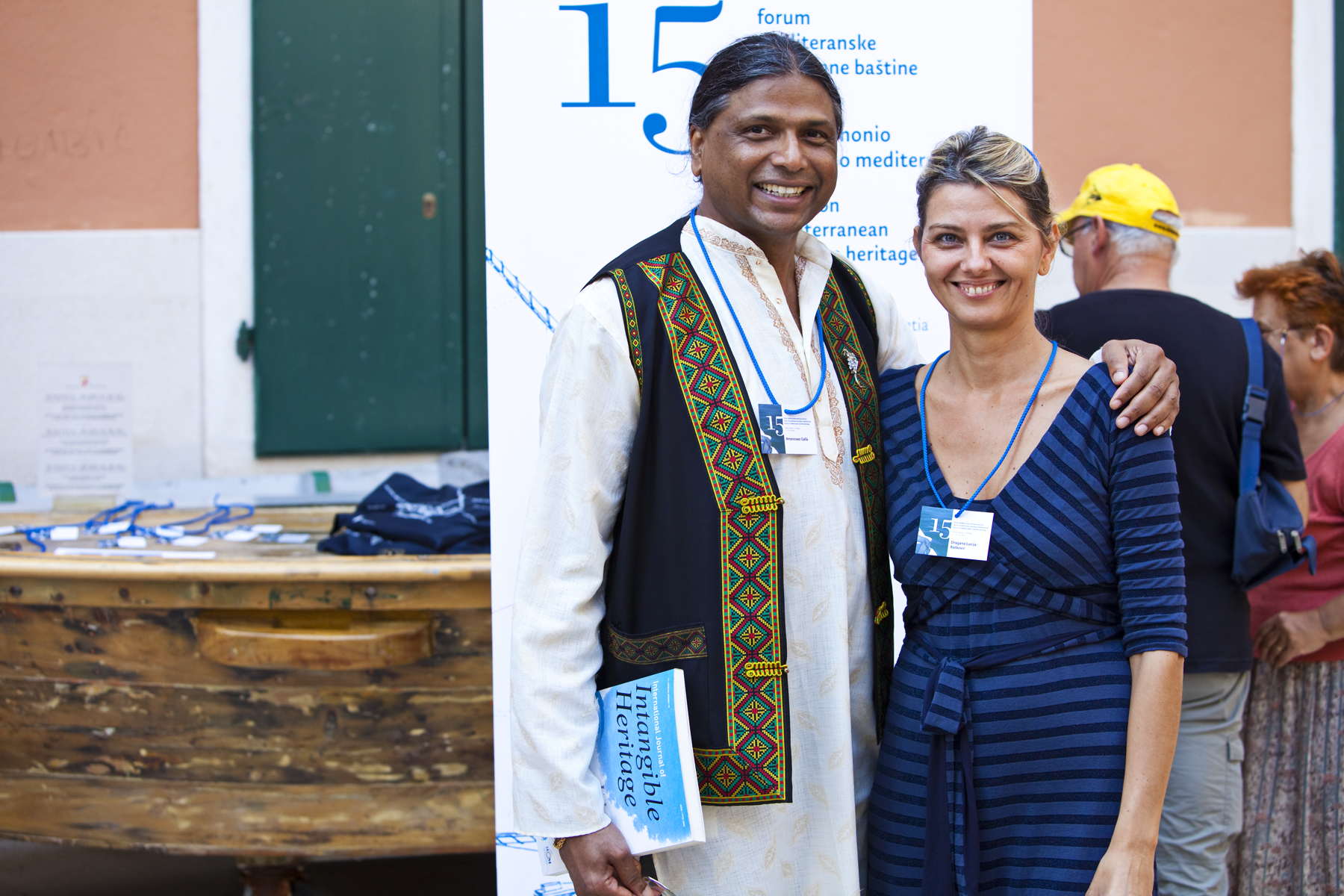
Forum AMMM, Rovinj 2009.

In 2005, she obtained a European Diploma in Cultural Management from the Marcel Hicter Foundation, Brussels and in the same year founded a company operating in the fields of heritage interpretation, museology (eco-museology), heritage management and sustainable cultural tourism.

=== Maritime heritage and community museums ===
In 2003, in cooperation with the local community, she participated in the development of the Batana Ecomuseum, which encouraged the establishment of a number of maritime community museums throughout the Adriatic. In 2007, the Batana Ecomuseum was shortlisted for the European Museum of the Year Award. It was included in the UNESCO Register of Best Practices for the Preservation of the Intangible Cultural Heritage of the World in 2016.

Through her activities, she also contributes to the introduction of ecomuseums in Croatian museum legislation.

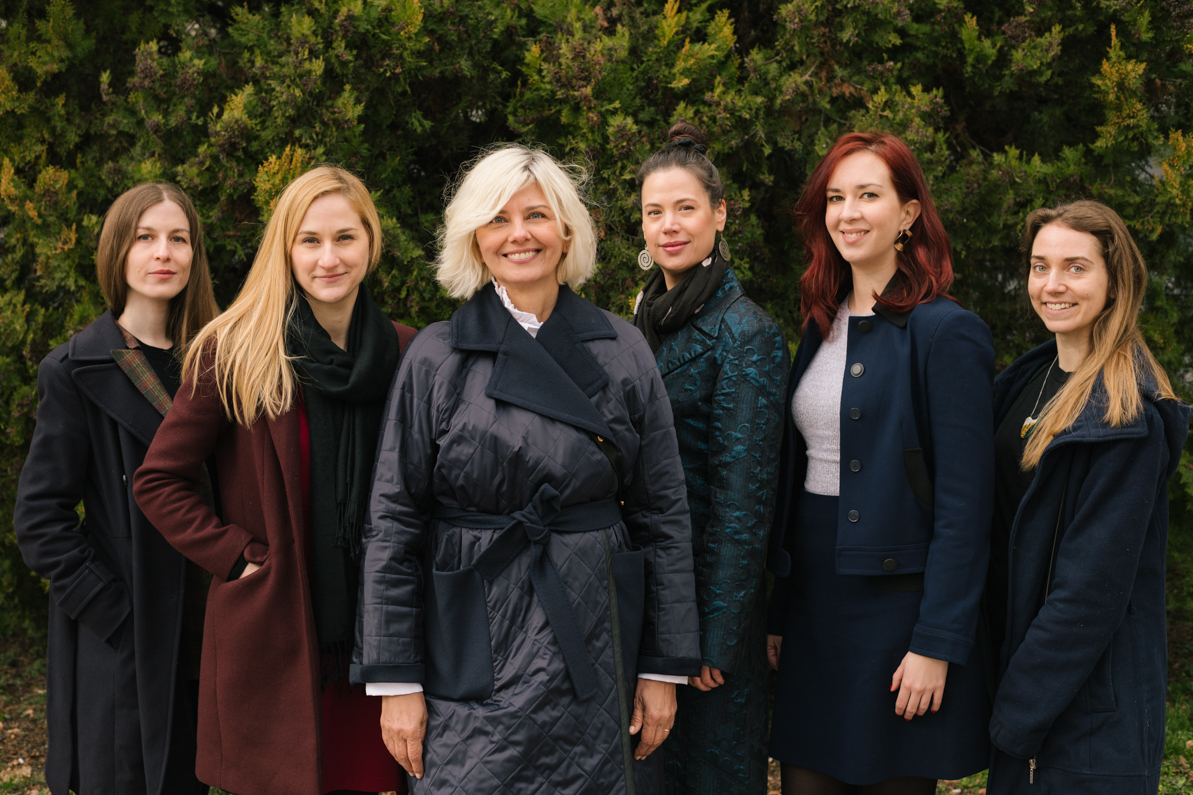
Muses team, Zagreb 2022

=== Sustainable cultural tourism in practice ===
In 2006, she participated in the development of cultural tourism in Ogulin. Ivana Brlić-Mažuranić's fairy tales have been recognized as the central cultural potential for the development of Ogulin, the homeland of fairy tales and cultural and tourist products: the Ogulin Fairy Tale Festival (OGFB) and the Ivana's House of Fairy Tales Visitor's Centre. The permanent exhibition of the Ivana's House of Fairy Tales Visitor's Centre was declared the best in 2013 by the Croatian Museum Council in Croatia, and in 2016 it was shortlisted for the European Museum of the Year award.

=== Croatian national parks and nature parks ===
In the period from 2012 to 2016, she managed the project of interpretation and presentation of nature for 30 investments of the network of national parks, nature parks and protected areas of the Republic of Croatia within EU Natura 2000. National parks of the Republic of Croatia communicate as a single entity with a common visual identity and systematic development of interpretive infrastructure, of which the Underground Secrets of Paklenica Visitor Centre in Paklenica National Park, the Poklon Visitor Centre in Učka Nature Park, the Medvedgrad Visitor Centre in Medvednica Nature Park, and the Med dvemi vodami Visitor Centre in Međimurje.

=== Volunteering ===
She volunteers in various national and European heritage associations. In 2009, she was elected president of the Barcelona-based Association of Mediterranean Maritime Museums (AMMM). Since 2020, she has been the president of the Croatian Association for the Interpretation of Heritage, and since 2019 a member of the supervisory board of Interpret Europe.

== Selected bibliography ==
- Ratković, Dragana. (1998). Dva ciklusa Lerchingerova kruga u Zagrebu. Peristil, year 41, pp. 79–90
- Ratković, Dragana Lucija. (2005). The Batana of Rovinj − Rovigno. u: ed. Marcet I Barbe, R. Maritime Heritage and Modern Ports. Boston: Wit Press, pp. 207−217
- Kulturna baština: Tar, Frata, Vabriga. (2006.) (ed. Ratković, Dragana Lucija.) Poreč: Poreč heritage museum
- Ratković, Dragana Lucija. (2007). Ivanina kuća bajke u Ogulinu, njihovu zajedničkom zavičaju. Museology: a collection of museum issues, no. 43/44, pp. 306–314
- Ratković, Dragana Lucija. (2012). Batana Ecomuseum, Rovinj − Rovigno. Croatian ecomuseology "at the backdoor". in: ECOMUSEUMS 2012 Proceeding of the First International Conference on Ecomuseums, Community Museums and Living Communities. Green Lines Institute, pp. 319–328
- Informatica Museologica, (2013). no. 44 (1-4). (ed. Dražin-Trbuljak, Lada. Ratković, Dragana Lucija.)
- Ratković Aydemir, Dragana Lucija. (2017). Safeguarding maritime intangible cultural heritage: Ecomuseum Batana, Croatia. (ed. Davis, Peter; Stefano, Michelle L.) in The Routledge Companion to Intangible Cultural Heritage, New York: Routledge
- Ratković Aydemir, Dragana Lucija. (2019). Let's interpret natural heritage so that we love it more! Croatian Experience by Muze/Muses. (ed. Kreisel, Werner. Reeh, Tobias.) in Tourism Research and Landscape Interpretation / Tourismusforschung und Landschaftsinterpretation. Universitätsverlag Göttingen, pp. 161–174
- Ratković Aydemir, Dragana Lucija. Tolić, Helena. Jagić Boljat, Ivana. (2019): Intangible Cultural Heritage as a Catalyst for Local Development and Well-being: The Case of Pleternica, Croatia, Journal Museum International, Volume 71 - Issue 3–4, pp. 156–167
- Priručnik za interpretaciju baštine (2020) (ed. Draženović, Mirna. Smrekar, Aleš. authors: Ratković Aydemir, Dragana Lucija. Jagić Boljat, Ivana. Draženović, Mirna. Klarić Vujović, Iva. Kuka, Mateja. Polajnar Horvat, Katarina. Smrekar, Aleš.), ZRC SAZU, Anton Melik Geographical Institute, Ljubljana
