= Interpret Europe =

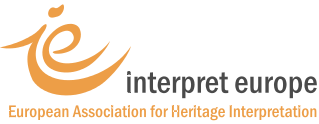
- Founded: 2010
- Type: International organization
- Purpose: Heritage interpretation
- Headquarters: Witzenhausen, Germany
- Region served: Europewide
- Members: 1218 in 56 countries (2019)
- Directors: Thorsten Ludwig and Helena Vičić
- Website: www.interpret-europe.net

Interpret Europe – European Association for Heritage Interpretation is an international membership-based association with charitable status that serves all who use first-hand experiences to give natural and cultural heritage a deeper meaning. Interpret Europe encourages dialogue and partnerships between associations and universities, providers and professionals from more than 56 countries.

== History ==
Heritage interpretation developed in US National Parks during the first half of the 20th century and was originally defined by Freeman Tilden in 1957. The first national association in Europe was the Society for the Interpretation of Britain’s Heritage, founded in 1975. Interpret Europe was first developed as an open network in 2000, while the association was formally established in 2010.

== Structure ==
Interpret Europe operates on a two-tier system with an Executive Board of Directors and a Supervisory Committee. The Board of Directors manages the organisation and comprises at least two members, each authorised to act as legal representatives. The Board of Directors is appointed by a Supervisory Committee, consisting of three to nine members. The Supervisory Committee is elected by the General Assembly which must approve the activities of both the Board of Directors and the Supervisory Committee.

The current Managing Director is Helena Vičič (Slovenia), and the members of the Supervisory Committee are Eva Sandberg (Sweden), Acting Chair, Yael Bamberger (Israel), Barbara Gołębiowska (Poland), Jurn Buismann (Netherlands) and Gerald Wagenhofer (Austria).

== Aims ==
Interpret Europe fosters research and practice on the field of heritage interpretation.

Heritage interpretation is a non-formal learning approach encouraging people to search for meanings that natural or cultural heritage holds for them through first-hand experiences of heritage sites, objects or events. It is a worldwide approach mainly used in protected areas, at monuments, in museums or at zoological or botanical gardens.

Interpret Europe promotes itself as a European platform for cooperation and exchange for these institutions, as well as universities where heritage interpretation is taught.

== Activities ==
Interpret Europe holds conferences, participates in international projects and organises training events.

Conferences typically feature up to 100 presentations, workshops and study visits, with most conference participants contributing to them. Interpret Europe conferences have been held in Germany (2011), Italy (2012), Sweden (2013), Croatia (2014), Poland (2015), Belgium (2016), United Kingdom (2017), Hungary (2018), Bosnia and Herzegovina (2019), Romania (2023) and Poland (2025). The conferences in 2020 and 2021 were held online. The 2016 Interpret Europe Conference, in Belgium, addressed the theme of "Heritage Interpretation – for the Future of Europe" and was dedicated to the question of how the experience of visiting historic sites contributes to learning about subjects such as human rights, active citizenship and peace. It led to the initiative "Engaging citizens with Europe’s cultural heritage", which was awarded the European Union’s Altiero Spinelli Prize 2017.

International projects focus on a number of subject areas, including the development of European quality criteria (LEADER “Transinterpret” Project, Leonardo “TOPAS” Project), the development of training course offers (Leonardo “HeriQ” Project, Erasmus+ “DELPHI” Project), working with specific audiences (Grundtvig “HISA” Project) and dealing with competence-based learning approaches (Leonardo “IOEH” Project, Grundtvig “InHerit” Project, Erasmus+ “HIMIS” Project).

Training events are offered in different languages and currently focus on certification courses for interpretive guides, hosts, writers, planners and live interpreters at visitor-related facilities, such as parks or museums.

== Cooperation ==
Interpret Europe is a member of the European Heritage Alliance, Climate Heritage Network and the European Union’s Expert Group for Cultural Heritage (Cultural Heritage Forum).

It is part of the Global Alliance for Heritage Interpretation, cooperating with the National Association for Interpretation (USA), Interpretation Canada, Interpretation Australia and other networks and initiatives.

In Europe, the association is related to Associação de Interpretação do Património Natural e Cultural (Portugal), Asociación para la Interpretación del Patrimonio (Spain), Association for Heritage Interpretation (UK), Interpretirajmo Hrvatsku (Croatia), Interpret Switzerland (Switzerland), and Sdružení pro interpretaci místního dědictví (Czech Republic). Interpret Europe supports the development of further national associations in Europe.

Interpret Europe is a partner in Destination of Sustainable Cultural Tourism Awards with European Cultural Tourism Network (ECTN) as organizer in partnership with Europa Nostra, the European Travel Commission and NECSTouR, and supported by the European Association of Archaeologists (EAA) and the ReInHerit Horizon2020 CSA.
