= Nature trail =

Hiking trail providing visitors with knowledge

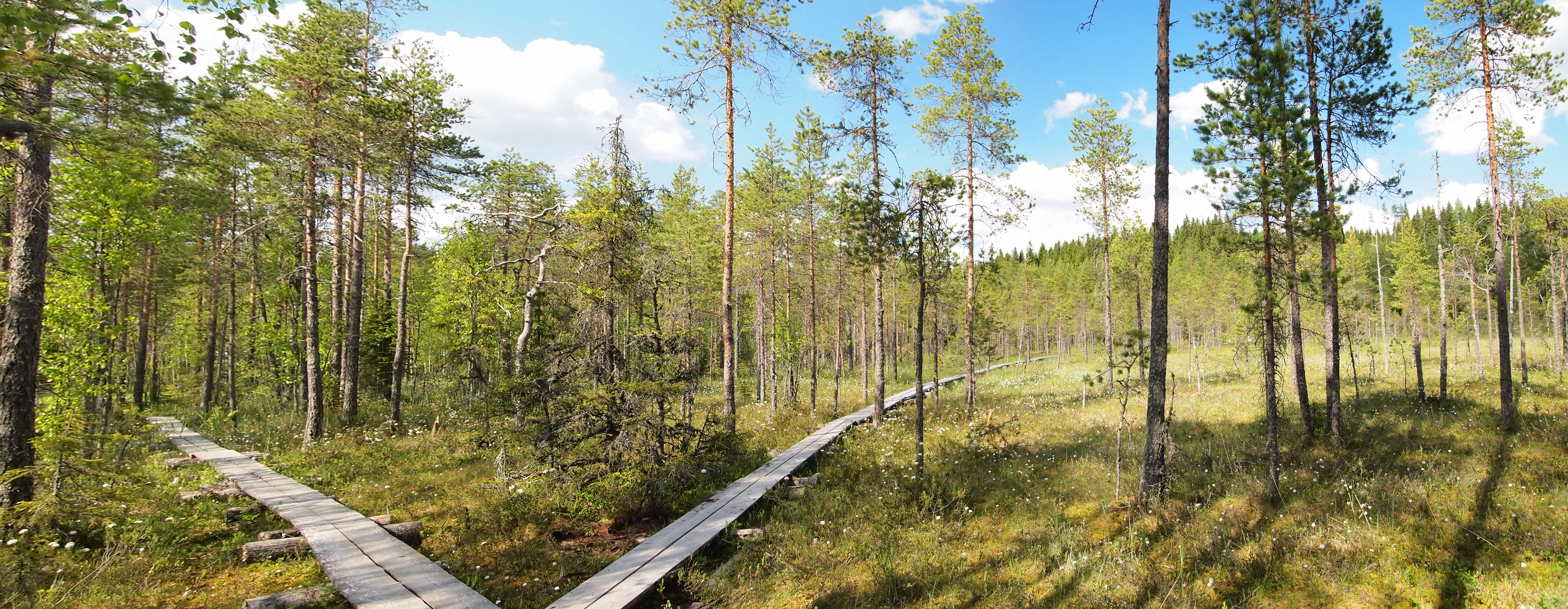
Nature trail in Nyrölä, Jyväskylä, Central Finland

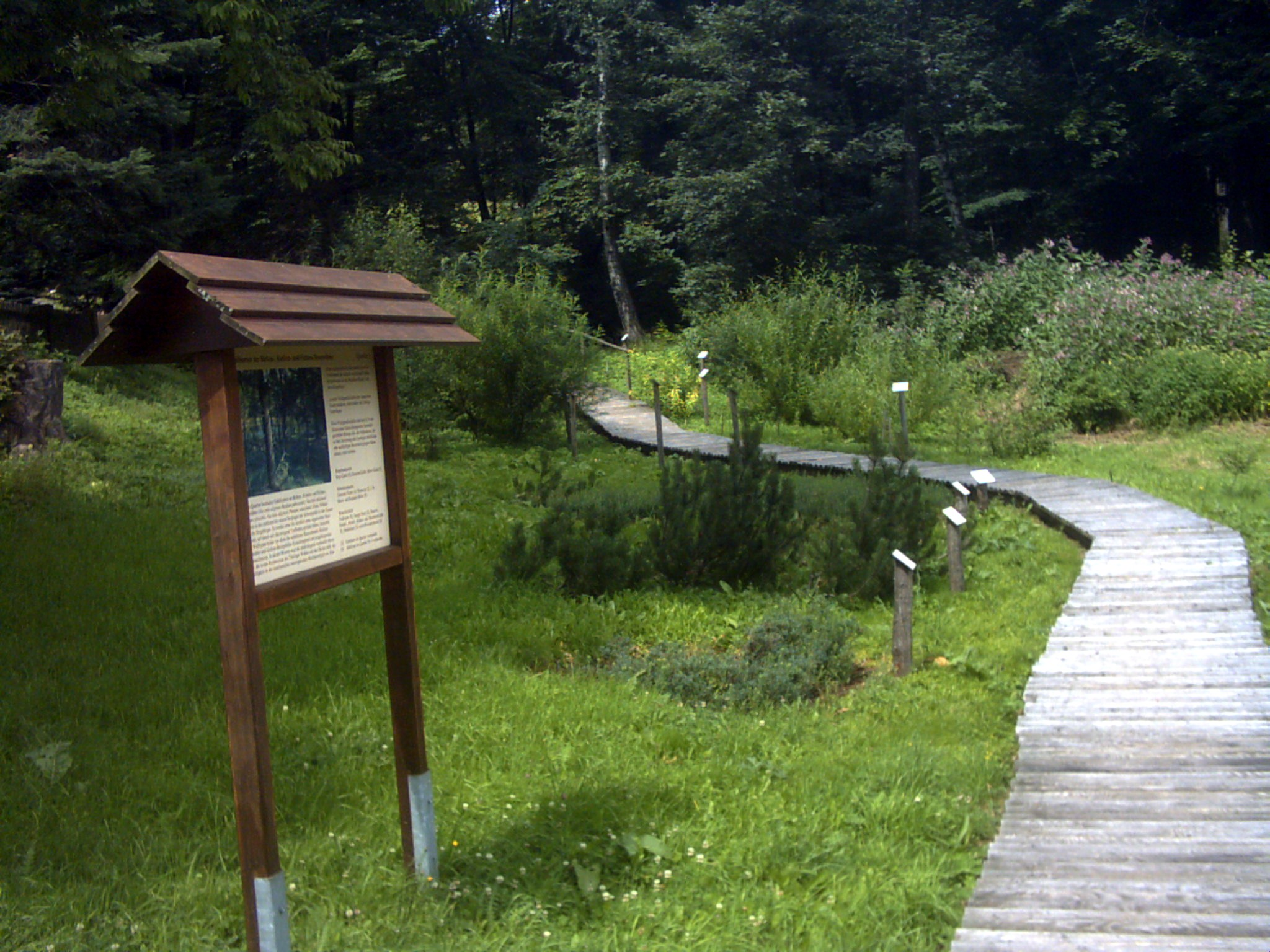
Nature trail in Bärenfels, Saxon Switzerland, Germany

A nature trail (sometimes nature walk, educational path, educational trail, or interpretive trail) is a specially developed hiking trail or footpath that runs through the countryside, along which there are marked stations or stops next to points of natural, technological or cultural interest. These may convey information about, for example, flora and fauna, soil science, geology, mining, ecology or cultural history. Longer trails that link more widely spaced natural phenomena or structures together may be referred to as themed trails or paths.

In order to give a clearer explanation of the objects located at each station, interpretive signs or other exhibits are usually erected, in keeping with the purpose of the trail. These may include: information boards, photographs and pictures, maps or plans, display cases and models, slides, sound or multimedia devices, facilities to enable experimentation and so on. The routes are regularly maintained.

Nature trails with a strong thematic content may also be called "theme paths", "theme trails" or "theme routes", or may be specially named after their subject matter, for example the Welsh Mountain Zoo Trail, Anglezarke Woodland Trail, Cheshire Lines Railway Path, Great Harwood Nature Trail, Irwell Sculpture Trail, Salthill Quarry Geology Trail and Wildlife Conservation Trail.

The purpose of such trails is to increase knowledge, sometimes this is linked to tourism and recreation or the raising of environmental awareness. Often, the stations provide imaginative and interactive ways to experience nature. Occasionally, guided tours with expert guides are available.

== History ==
The first nature trail in the United States was created at Harriman State Park's Station for the Study of Insects, established by Frank E. Lutz of the American Museum of Natural History in cooperation with the Palisades Interstate Park. Lutz developed a trail around the station and posted small signs to identify interesting trees, plants, insect haunts, and other natural features. In 1926 Lutz transplanted his educational techniques and scientific interest to Bear Mountain by establishing the Trailside Museum in cooperation with the American Museum of Natural History. The Trailside Museum and Wildlife Center remains a significant asset for the PIPC.

At the beginning of the nature trail, the first sign read:

"The spirit of the training trail: a friend somewhat versed in natural history is taking a walk with you and calling your attention to interesting things."

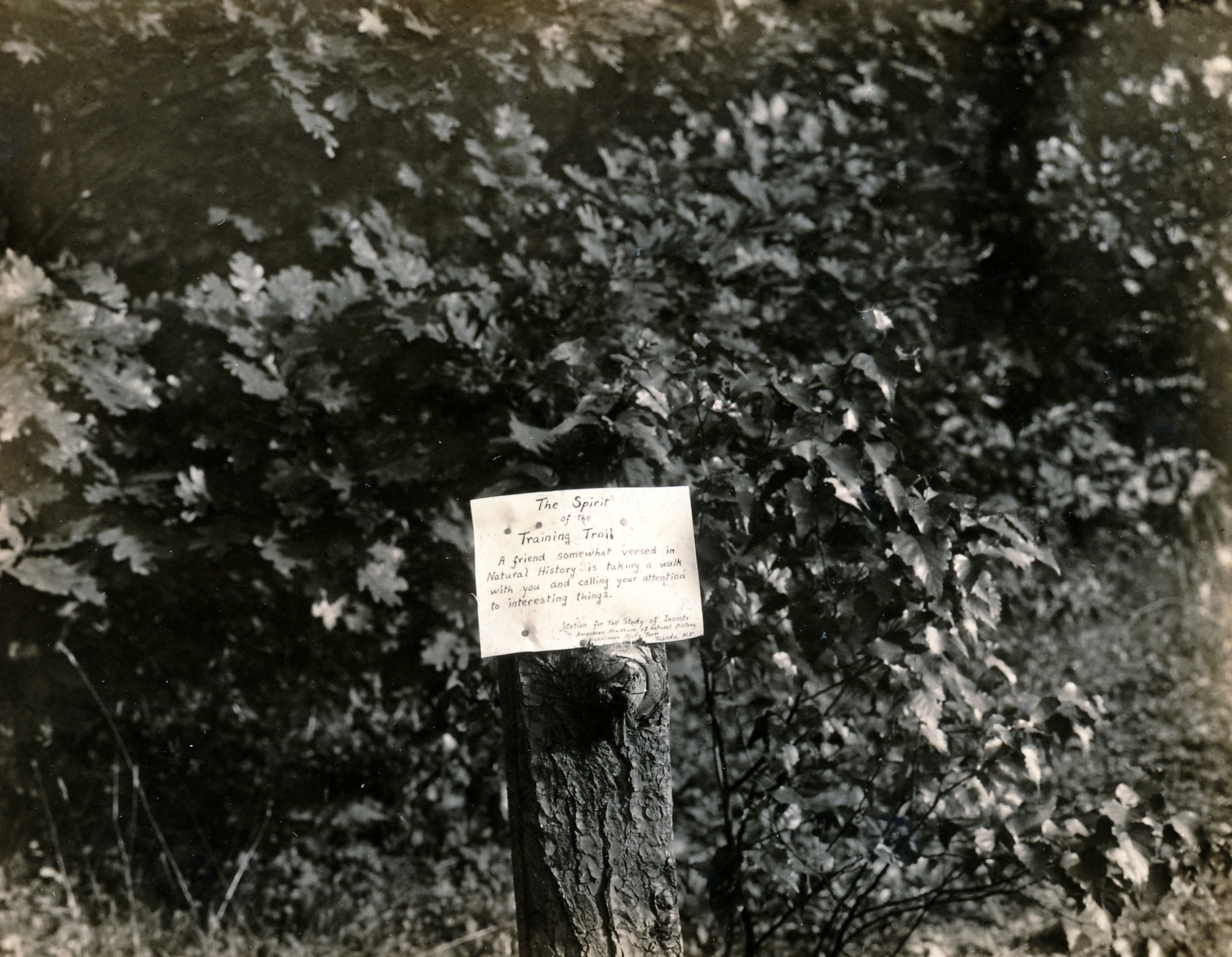
First sign along the Training Trail established by Frank E. Lutz in 1925 at the Harriman State Park Nature Trail

In 1930 the first nature trail was laid out in Germany. In the 1950s there was a sudden increase in nature trails in Germany, as growing urbanization led to a growth in the demand for recreation and an increase in car use led to greater mobility. From the 1960s in Germany nature trails were established primarily as forest trails to guide visitors. Most of them were signed paths that portrayed the forest ecosystem as worthy of protection in order to restrict the flood of urban drivers seeking recreation in natural areas. For this reason, circular nature trails were attached, initially, especially to large car parks on the edge of forests. In 1970 after the "European Nature Conservation Year" in Germany, the first Swiss nature trails were also established. At the beginning of the 1980s in Germany, nature trails were not just laid out as ordinary signed paths in which knowledge was conveyed by the written word only, but as trails where the perception and experience of nature with the senses was made more central. In 1998 it was estimated that the number of nature trails in Germany was around 1,000. Of these, 85% were forest and nature trails, and only 3% were nature experience trails. Since 2000, new media have increasingly been integrated into nature trails.

== Special types ==
There are also planet trails, which clarify the distances and dimensions of planets, and sculpture trails with artistic themes.

== See also ==
- Boardwalk
- Hiking trail
- Footpath
- Themed trail
