= Nature Exchange =

The Nature Exchange is a specialized learning environment that encourages people to explore nature and actively observe, collect, study and share the world around them. It is a turn-key exhibit, now used in nature-based institutions around North America. Developed by Science North and AldrichPears Associates, the Nature Exchange is an interactive forum where visitors trade ethically collected natural objects and information about them to learn and engage with the natural world. Visitors earn points for each trade, based on criteria such as quality, rarity and their knowledge of the item. Science centers, nature centers and zoos use Nature Exchanges to raise awareness of key issues in the natural world, and, through personal interaction, changes attitudes and behavior.

== Locations ==
- Telus World of Science - Edmonton, Edmonton, Alberta
- Canadian Bushplane Heritage Centre, Sault Ste. Marie, Ontario
- Chattahoochee Nature Center, Roswell, Georgia
- BC Wildlife Park, Kamloops, British Columbia
- Las Vegas Springs Preserve, Nevada
- Zoomazium, Woodland Park Zoo – Seattle, Washington - CLOSED
- Tulsa Zoo, Tulsa, Oklahoma
- Kidspace Children's Museum, Pasadena, California
- Exploration Place – Prince George, British Columbia
- Lacerte Family Children's Zoo, Dallas Zoo, Dallas, Texas
- Science North, Sudbury, Ontario
- Santa Barbara Museum of Natural History, Santa Barbara, California
- John P. McGovern Children's Zoo, Houston Zoo, Houston, Texas
- Dynamic Earth, Sudbury, Ontario
- Roper Mountain Science Center, Greenville, South Carolina
