= Math walk =

Educational walk

A math walk, or math trail, is a type of themed walk in the US, where direct experience is translated into the language of mathematics or abstract mathematical sciences such as information science, computer science, decision science, or probability and statistics. Some sources specify how to create a math walk whereas others define a math walk at a specific location such as a junior high school or in Boston. The journal The Mathematics Teacher includes a special section titled "Mathematical Lens" in many issues with the metaphor of lens capturing seeing the world as mathematics.

== Informal learning ==
The idea that "math is everywhere", which is emphasized on a math walk, is captured by the philosophy of mathematicism with its early adherents, Pythagoras and Plato. The math walk also implicitly involves experiencing math via modeling since mathematics serves to model what we sense. The math walk is a form of informal learning, often in an outside environment or in a museum. This type of learning is contrasted with formal learning, which tends to be more structured and performed in a classroom. Math walks have been shown to encourage students to think more deeply about mathematics, and to connect school content to the real world.

== Maps and object discovery ==
There are different approaches to designing a math walk. The walk can be guided or unguided. In a guided walk, the learners are guided by a person knowledgeable in the topic of mathematics. In an unguided walk, learners are provided with a map. The map identifies walking stops and identifiers, such as QR codes or bluetooth beacons, to provide additional information on how the objects experienced during a math walk are translated into mathematical language.

== Example math walk scene ==
A walk can involve translation only, or translation and problem solving. For example, considering a window on a building involves first perceiving the window. After perception, there is a translation of the form of the window to mathematical language, such as the array $(w,l)$ where $w$ is the window's width and $l$ is the window's length. The array $(w,l)$ is a mathematical model of the window. This modeling is pure translation, without explicit problem solving. Questions such as "what is the area of the window?" require not only translation, but also the problem of solving for area: $a = l \times w$.

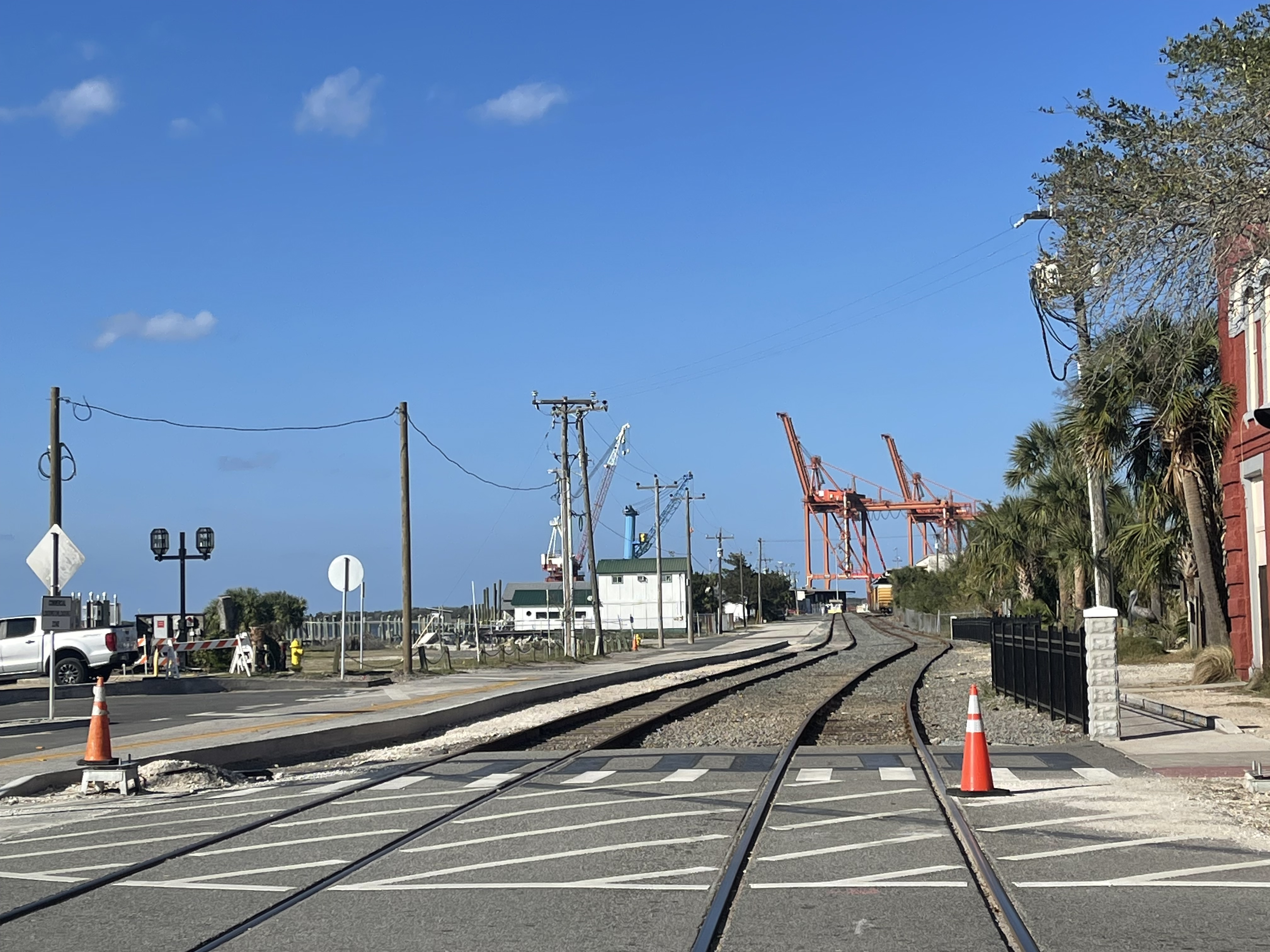
Railroad tracks and other objects comprising part of a math walk in Fernandina Beach Historic District.

A photo of the railroad tracks in Fernandina Beach Historic District captures a stop on a math walk. The walk's information can focus on discrete items. These items reflect counting and number sense. Examples of discrete items are the cloud structures, the distant red harbor cranes, power line poles, wooden railroad ties, the diagonal lines in the road, and the cross walk across the rails.

The counting of the ties leads to the idea of iteration in computer programming and, more generally, to discrete mathematics, the core of computer science. For iteration, we can use a programming language such as Python or C to encode the syntactical form of the iteration for a computer program.

Other computer science related topics include a labeled directed graph that defines a semantic network. Such a network captures the objects in the photo as well as the relations among those objects. The semantic network is generally represented by a diagram with circles (concepts) and arrows (directed relations). There are additional indirect mathematical relations, including a differential equation that would define the motion of the train engine, with time as an independent variable.

== Connecting school subject to standards ==
Exemplars of informal learning, such as a math walk, create opportunities for traditional education in school. Math walks can be a component in classroom pedagogy or in an after-school event. A key strategy is to create a mapping from what is learned on the walk to what is learned in school. This task is complicated due to geographic region, classification, and standards. A math walk can be situated as early as elementary school.

The map to disciplinary subject area in US Math Education begins with the majority of states having adopted Common Core, which includes English Language and Mathematics. Within each state's standards, one must identify the grade level. A table in Common Core, titled "Mathematics Domains at Each Grade Level" summarizes the mapping of math subject to level. Once the mapping is known between object on the math walk and corresponding school subjects, this mapping should be included as part of the walk information. This linkage will assist both student and teacher. "Know your audience" is key to the successful educational delivery along a math walk.
