= Earthplace =

Non-profit organization in Connecticut, US

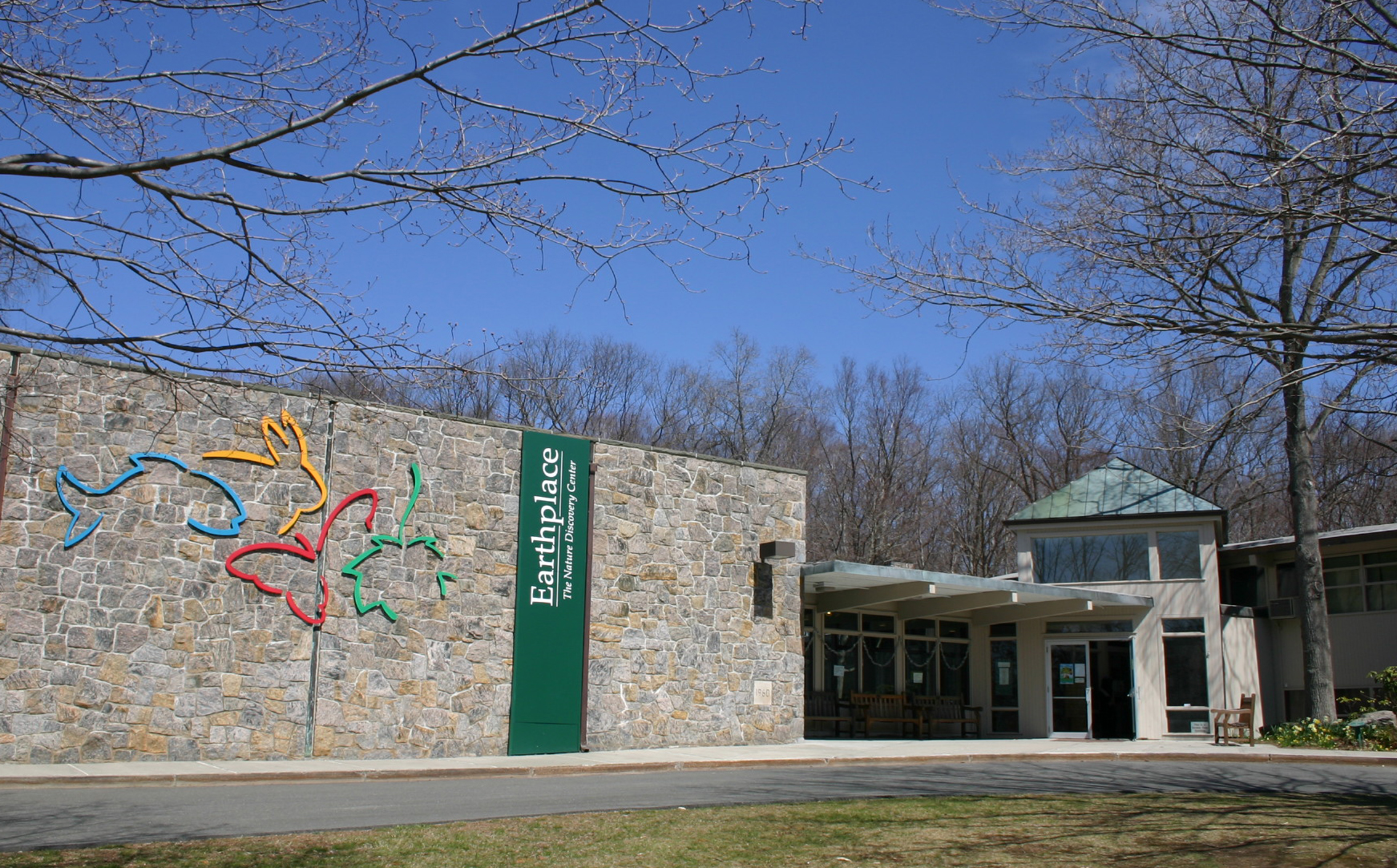
- Formation: 1958
- Headquarters: Westport, Connecticut
- Executive Director: Amee Borys
- Website: earthplace.org

Earthplace is a non-profit science education organization, in Westport, Connecticut, in the United States. Its main focus is on the natural world and sustainability.

== Features ==
NaturePlace: A museum room that features interactive nature displays, hands-on activities and a video theater. Five wildlife dioramas depict Connecticut's animals and plants found in various seasons and ecosystems.

Animal Hall: Earthplace houses a collection of rescued wildlife that are exhibited as species ambassadors, including bald eagles, hawks, turkey vultures, a black vulture, several types of owls, a box and wood turtle, little brown bats, and more. Due to their injuries, these animals cannot be released back into the wild. Several domestic animals are used in public programs, including rabbits, ferrets, guinea pigs, and Madagascar hissing cockroaches.

Hiking Trails: Earthplace maintains a 62-acre (25 ha) sanctuary, which is the largest open-space in Westport. Trails cross areas of wetlands, ponds, streams, hardwood forests and meadows. Sightings of rabbits, chipmunks, deer, box turtles, wild turkeys, bullfrogs, wood frogs and many birds are regularly made on the trails.

Event venue: In 2016, Earthplace created its 125-seat, open-air amphitheater. The site, as well as the adjacent 'event space', and the indoor auditorium are rentable spaces used for weddings, birthday parties, and more.

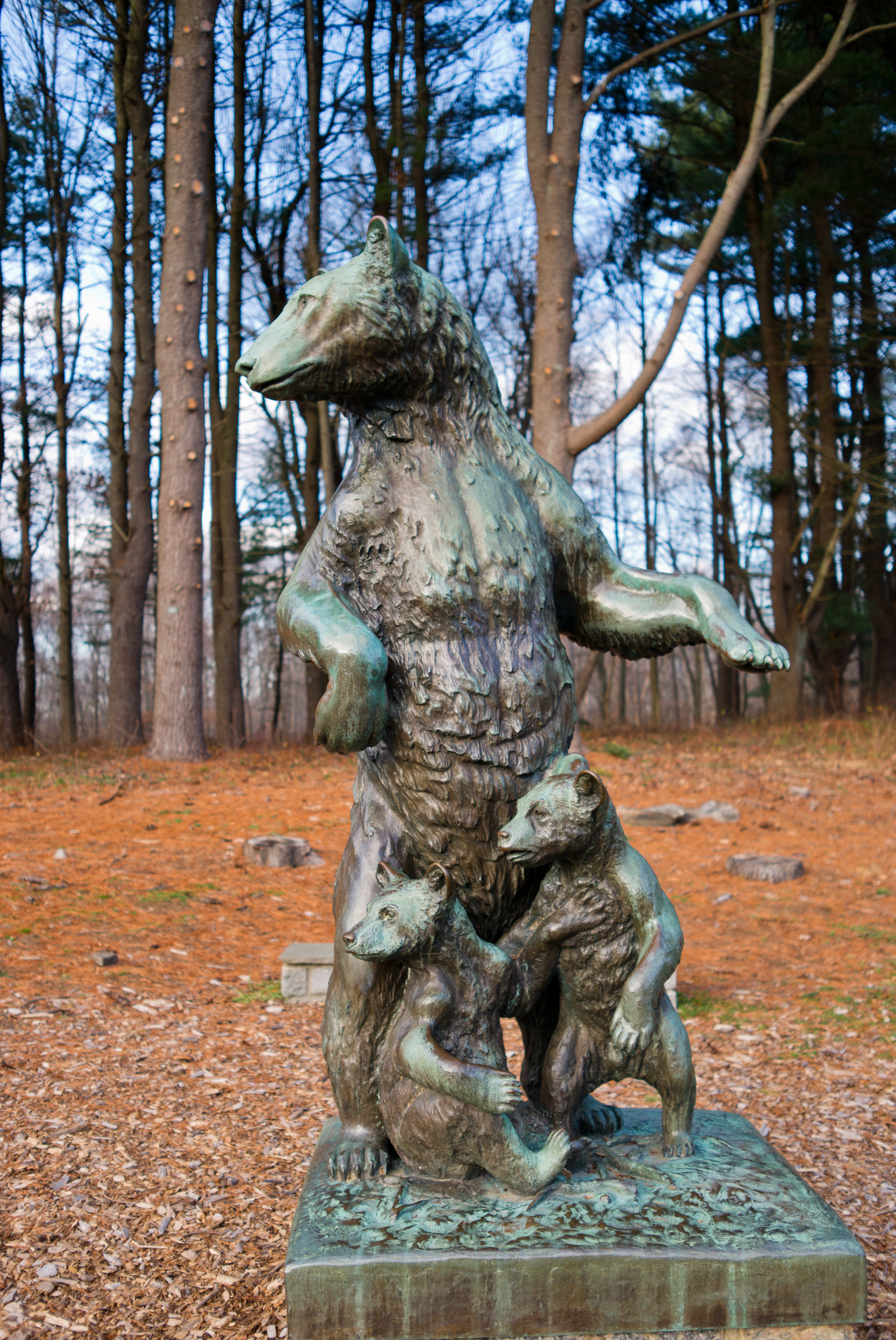
Mother Bear and Cubs, bronze statue by Anna Hyatt Huntington

The Native Plants Courtyard was designed in 1960 by landscape architect Eloise Ray to highlight plants native to southwestern Connecticut. Species include bloodroot, trillium, jack-in-the-pulpit, wild ginger, Solomon's seal, yellow lady's slipper and prickly pear cactus.

A bronze statue of a mother bear and two cubs by animal sculptor Anna Hyatt Huntington is placed near the entrance to two major trails.

== Environmental activities ==
Harbor Watch, located in Earthplace, is a water quality monitoring program. Staff scientists work with volunteers to take water samples from area streams and rivers, which are then analyzed in the center's state-certified laboratory. Harbor Watch also monitors the population of juvenile benthic fish in the Norwalk harbor.

The Mary Eason Swett wildlife rehabilitation program rescued hundred of local animals each year, with the goal of releasing each animal back into the wild. The program was discontinued in 2011.

== Education ==
Earthplace Preschool has been operating on the grounds since 1967 and is certified by the National Association for the Education of Young Children (NAEYC) and licensed by the state of Connecticut. Earthplace operates an accredited summer camp program, and offers after-school nature education programs, a preschool, and scout group programs.

== History ==
Earthplace was founded in 1958 as one of the many science and nature museums being developed around the US by groups led by naturalist John Ripley Forbes.

The Mid-Fairfield County Youth Museum opened in 1961. In 1973 the organization changed its name to the Nature Center for Environmental Activities. In 2002 the name was changed to Earthplace, The Nature Discovery Center. In 2007, the 22 acre Partrick Wetlands open space was donated to Earthplace.

== See also ==
- John Ripley Forbes
