= Frank Eugene Lutz =

American entomologist (1879–1943)

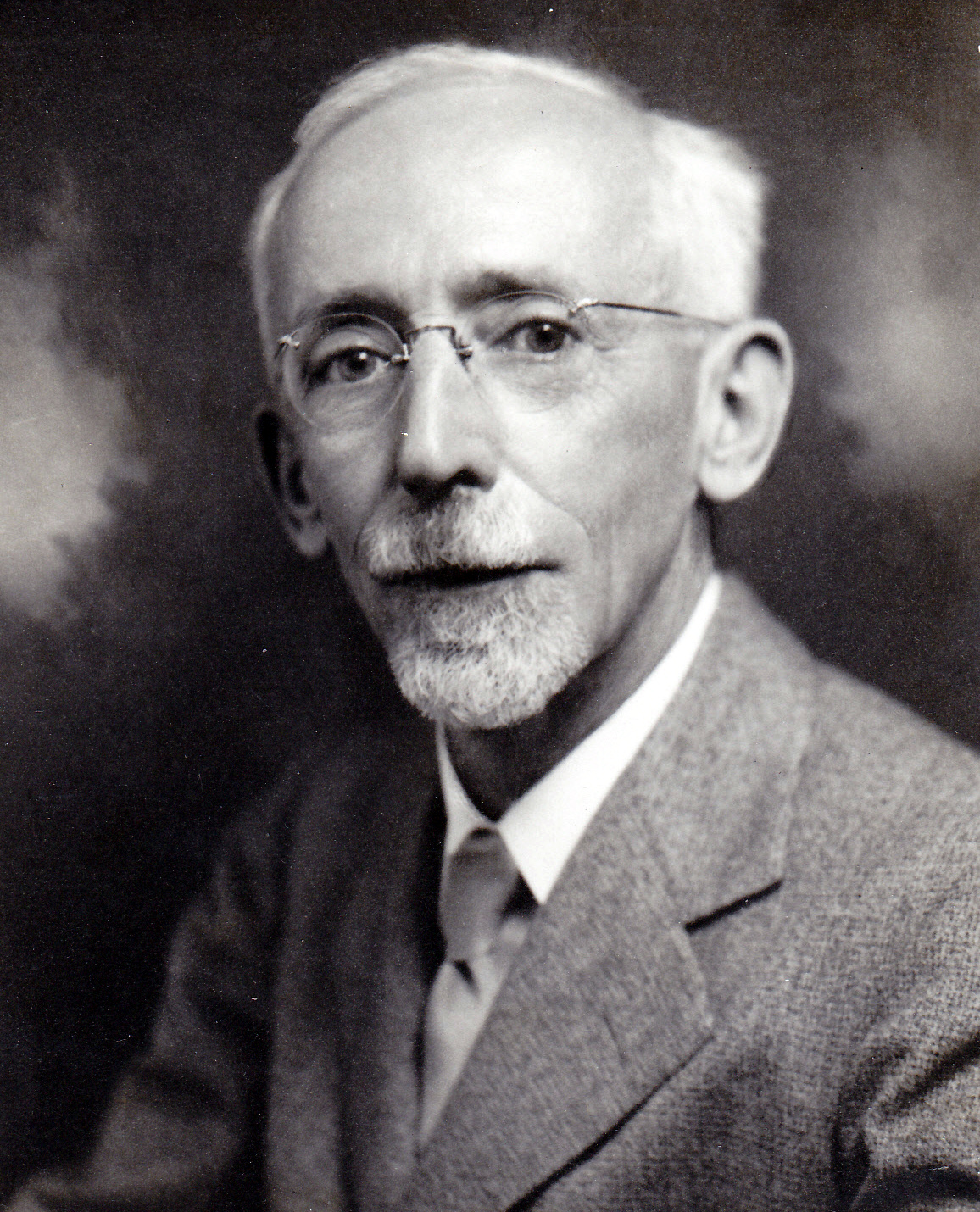
- Frank Eugene Lutz
- Born: September 15, 1879; Bloomsburg, Pennsylvania
- Died: November 27, 1943 (aged 64)
- Education: University of Chicago
- Occupation: Entomologist
- Employer(s): American Museum of Natural History, New York City
- Known for: genetics of Drosophila

Frank Eugene Lutz (September 15, 1879 – November 27, 1943) was an American entomologist. He worked as a curator of invertebrates at the American Museum of Natural History. He took a special interest in insect ecology and behavior, beginning with studies on the chronobiology of crickets. He was also among the first to study genetics in Drosophila and was responsible for introducing it as a potentially superior model organism to T. H. Morgan. He was also a nature educator, and designed a self-guided trail system, and wrote several popular books on entomology.

== Biography ==
Lutz was born in Bloomsburg. Lutz became interested in nature from an early age, and read extensively. He did well in school and his parents decided to let him enter college even though they were financially stretched to support him. His parents had initially wished that he would become an insurance agent, a career that did not require much education.

=== College and Cold Spring Harbor ===
He went to Haverford College, Pennsylvania where his father had suggested that he study mathematics as he knew of insurance companies offered well-paying actuarial jobs. He graduated in 1900 (A.B.). During his college days, his father once discovered a swarm of stick insects and reported it. Lutz knew that they were rare and remembered an advertisement of a New York firm that supplied specimens for study. He called the company and asked them if they were interested in a supply of specimens and what they would offer for a single stick insect. He was told they would pay a penny for one and he collected them in sacks without counting. He thought he must have about 2000 and asked for $15. Later in his career he met the president of that company. At college he found the idea of becoming an actuary unexciting and considered medicine as a better pursuit. He then shifted to study biology subjects. He however had to fund his studies and he applied for an actuarial job at an insurance firm in Philadelphia where he was turned down due to bad handwriting. His biology professor Henry Sherring Pratt suggested that he should try for a scholarship under C. B. Davenport in Chicago and to work the summer at the Cold Spring Harbor where both Pratt and Davenport spent summers. The work involved dealing with dishes in the kitchen and dining room and also conducting some research. Davenport was interested in biometrics, the application of mathematical techniques to biology. Lutz collected and counted scallops examining the ridges on their shells and examined the variation using statistical techniques.

=== University of Chicago ===
The summer work and publication at the Cold Spring Harbor helped Lutz receive a scholarship to attend the University of Chicago. It only covered tuition and he lived in the spare bedroom of the Davenport family. He also worked at a restaurant to support his studies. He received his master's degree in 1902. In summer he went to Cold Spring Harbor and was involved in a mosquito control project. He then went to Europe to study biometrics for ten months under Karl Pearson.

=== Europe ===
Lutz went to England to University College, London, England, attending Pearson's classes. He was the first American student of Pearson. He also visited Berlin before returning to the University of Chicago to begin work on his Ph.D.

=== Return to the University of Chicago ===
Lutz returned to work on the biometrics of crickets. His supervisor Davenport headed the Station for Experimental Evolution in Cold Spring Harbor, Long Island, New York from 1904 to 1909. Lutz became a resident investigator there. He conducted genetic studies of Drosophila under William Ernest Castle who was also using rats to study genetics. At the time, Lutz found an extra-veined strain and also looked at a white eyed mutant form and its genetics and brought it to the attention of T. H. Morgan. This led Morgan to shift from using rats for his genetic experiments to Drosophila. Assortative mating or the choice of mates with similar traits was one of his early interests. He examined assortative mating in humans using age comparisons of male and female partners. He noted that in crickets the right wing overlaps the left wing in males. He was interested in the genetics of such asymmetry and later looked at inheritance patterns in traits such as which thumb is above when one clasps hands together.

Lutz received a Ph.D. from the University of Chicago in 1907 under the supervision of C. B. Davenport. His thesis was on the morphometrics of cricket variation and was titled "The Variation and Correlations of Certain Taxonomic Characters of Gryllus".

=== American Museum of Natural History ===
Henry E. Crampton who worked at the Cold Spring Harbor was in need of a person in the entomology department at the American Museum of Natural History. He offered it to Lutz who took it reluctantly. In 1909, Lutz became assistant curator of invertebrate zoology at American Museum of Natural History, New York City, becoming associate curator in 1916 and finally a curator in 1921. Lutz went on collecting expeditions to the West Indies, Central and South America. He sent out specimens to specialists at various institutions and never described any new species, even taking pride for it. He studied living insects, ecology and behavior. He conducted experiments on crickets under artificial light and dark conditions to examine their endogenous circadian behavior in 1932. From 1922 he also worked with Floyd K. Richtmyer and conducted experiments on ultraviolet vision in insects. He also studied their perception in a range of bees which led to the award of a Abraham Cressy Morrison Prize. He also took an interest in insect calls and made gramophone records of a range of insects and frogs.

In 1925, Lutz pioneered the first self-guided or signed nature trail in the United States in Harriman State Park, an idea that spread quickly to parks across the country and the world. He served as a president of the Entomological Society of America in 1927.

== Personal life ==
Lutz married Martha Ellen Brobson of Philadelphia in 1904. They had four children.

== Writing ==
Lutz made numerous contributions to the scientific journals on the subjects of variation, heredity, assortative mating and entomology. He wrote Field Book of Insects, published in 1917, and illustrated in the main by Edna Libby Beutenmüller. Among his best known "expeditions" was a study of the insects in his backyard in Ramsey, New Jersey which he documented in his book A Lot of Insects, published in 1941.
