= John Ripley Forbes =

American naturalist and conservationist (1913–2006)

- Born: August 25, 1913
- Died: August 26, 2006 (aged 93); Sandy Springs, Georgia
- Occupations: Naturalist, Conservationist
- Parent: Kenneth Forbes

John Ripley Forbes (August 25, 1913 – August 26, 2006) was an American naturalist and conservationist who helped found hundreds of nature museums for children in over 200 communities and thirty states. His museums were noted for their interactivity as children could often even borrow animals.

== Early life ==
Forbes appreciation for nature was fostered during time spent at his family's summer cottage on Birch Island in Lake Winnipesaukee in New Hampshire. As a child he also was a frequent visitor to the Boston Children's Museum, the Brooklyn Children's Museum, and the American Museum of Natural History.

As a teenager, Forbes befriended William T. Hornaday, a noted zoologist and conservationist. Hornaday worked at the Smithsonian Museum and was instrumental in developing the animal collections and exhibits that would later become the National Zoo. Hornaday was also responsible for the creation of the Bronx Zoo. After retiring from the Bronx Zoo, Hornaday moved to Stamford, Connecticut. The teenage Forbes was a Boy Scout in Stamford at the time, and he approached Hornaday at his home after discovering a frog with a glowing belly during a troop hike. The two held a lengthy discussion to arrive at the conclusion that the frog had swallowed a firefly.

After completing high school, Forbes enrolled at the University of Iowa to study in their museum training program. He later briefly studied at the Boston School of Fine Arts before enrolling at Bowdoin College in Brunswick, Maine where he studied for a year.

== Later life ==
In 1937, Forbes served as a scientist in the Arctic expedition of explorer Donald MacMillan.

Also in 1937, Forbes founded the William T. Hornaday Foundation for children's museums which later became the Natural Science for Youth Foundation.

Forbes was instrumental in the establishment of many prominent museums and nature centers including the Kansas City Museum of History and Science, Earthplace in Westport, Connecticut and the Chattahoochee Nature Center in Roswell, Georgia.

Later in his career, worried about rampant real-estate development, he shifted his attention towards conservation, and he founded the Southeast Land Preservation Trust in 1976. He would subsequently establish several forest preserves.
