= Themed walk =

Pathway with information signs

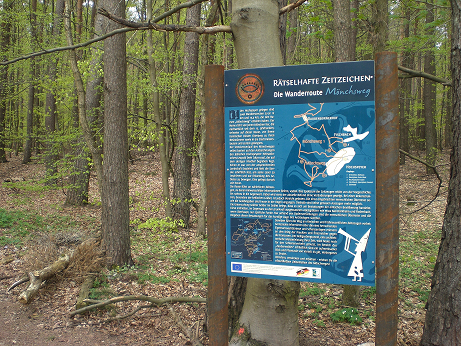
Monks Way, a themed walk near Hochspeyer, Germany

A themed walk is a type of informal learning and often is defined by a footpath along which there are information boards or other identifying codes (e.g. QR codes) covering a specific topic or theme such as history, geology or forestry. An academic discipline or school subject can define a theme. A walk can consist of one or more themes. Whilst themed walks are often designed to encourage walking, educational paths and nature trail tend to be aimed more at educating or training.

== Themes ==
For nature-based themes, paths may be several kilometres long and may be used both for educational purposes and recreation. They may connect places, buildings or natural features that have a particular theme in common by a signed route, but may also have specifically positioned exhibits.

For science themes, informal learning provides ways to engage in diverse settings. For themes related to nature, features of nature (e.g. raised bogs or biotopes) or of geology may be laid out as special educational paths.

For themes related to mathematics or physics, these walks provide objective interpretation of physical objects encountered en route.

== Management ==
Municipal authorities or local societies may be responsible for their establishment and maintenance. Other walks are managed by individuals who are highly knowledgeable in a theme, and host theme-based tours.

== Examples ==
In Austria there are more than 300 themed walks. These paths are intended to give summer tourism in the Alps a new impulse, but are also helping to improve the network of footpaths.

== See also ==
- Barefoot trail
- Boston Freedom Trail
- Educational trail
- Math walk (US)
- Footpath
- Sculpture trail
- Theme park
- Trail
