= The Gardens at the Las Vegas Springs Preserve =

Desert botanical garden

Coordinates: 36.168571°N 115.189092°W

The Gardens at the Springs Preserve, is an 8-acre (3.2 ha) desert botanical garden located in Las Vegas, Nevada. The gardens are currently located in the Las Vegas Springs Preserve at 333 S. Valley View Blvd.

Designed to teach water conservation through water-efficient landscaping, the Gardens offers free classes, demonstrations and expert advice.

== History ==
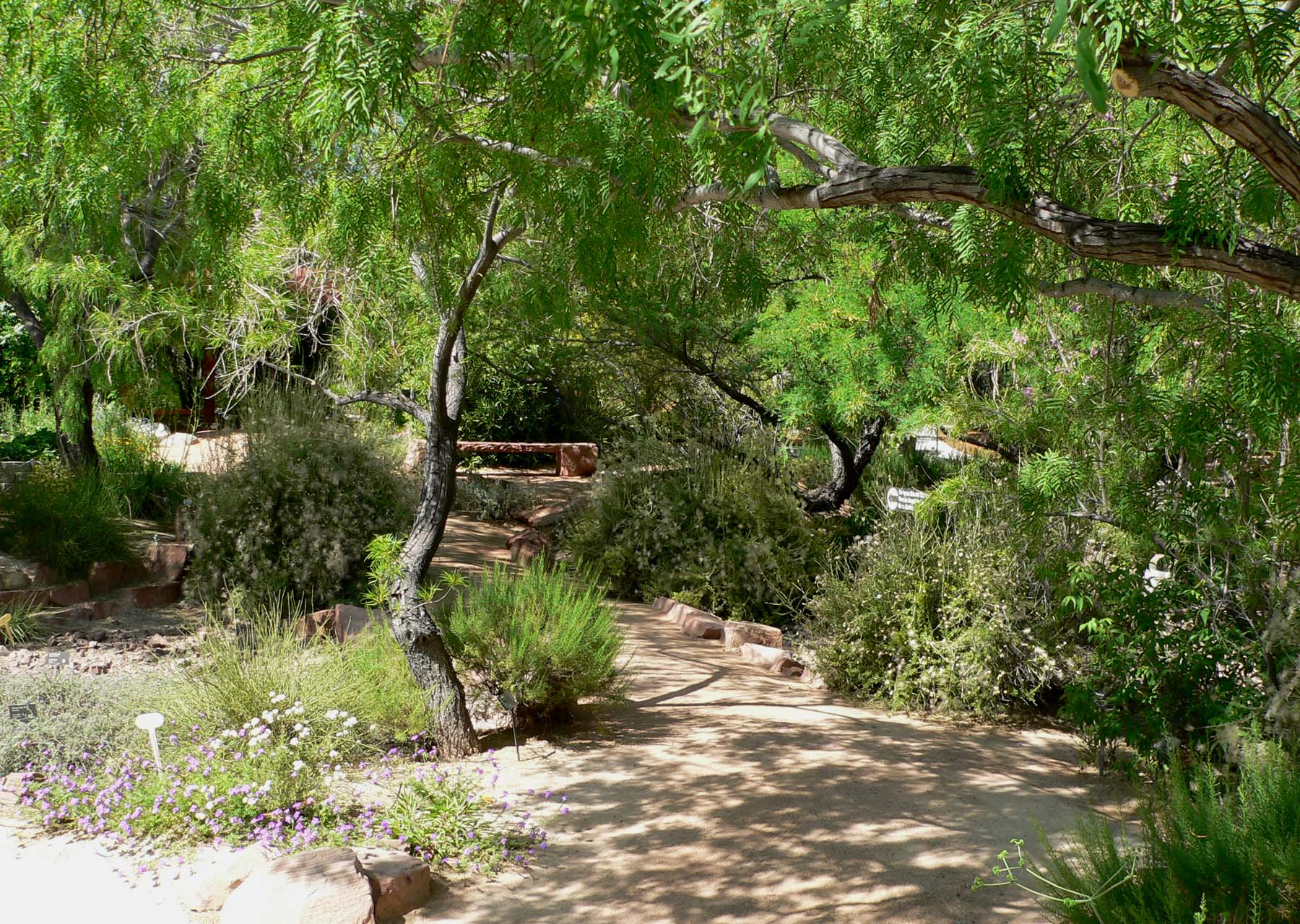
The area featuring native plants is shaded by mesquite trees at the old gardens

Located at 3701 West Alta Drive, the 2.5-acre (1.0 ha) Kiwanis Water Conservation Park opened in 1982 and contained over 300 species of desert-compatible plants arranged in a dozen gardens. The park was constructed on land donated by the Las Vegas Valley Water District. In 1986 the water district developed a master plan for the park. Following renovations to implement the master plan, the park was renamed and reopened in 1990 as the Desert Demonstration Gardens.

The Demonstration Gardens closed in early 2007 to facilitate moving to the new location. At the time, the site contained over 1,200 species of plants mostly from the deserts of the southwest. Since the plants are mature, many were moved in boxes as large as 84 inches (2.1 m) to the new site.

The gardens reopened on June 8, 2007 at the Springs Preserve.

== See also ==
- List of botanical gardens in the United States
