= Chattahoochee Nature Center =

Environmental education facility in Georgia, US

Coordinates: 34°0′16″N 84°22′58″W

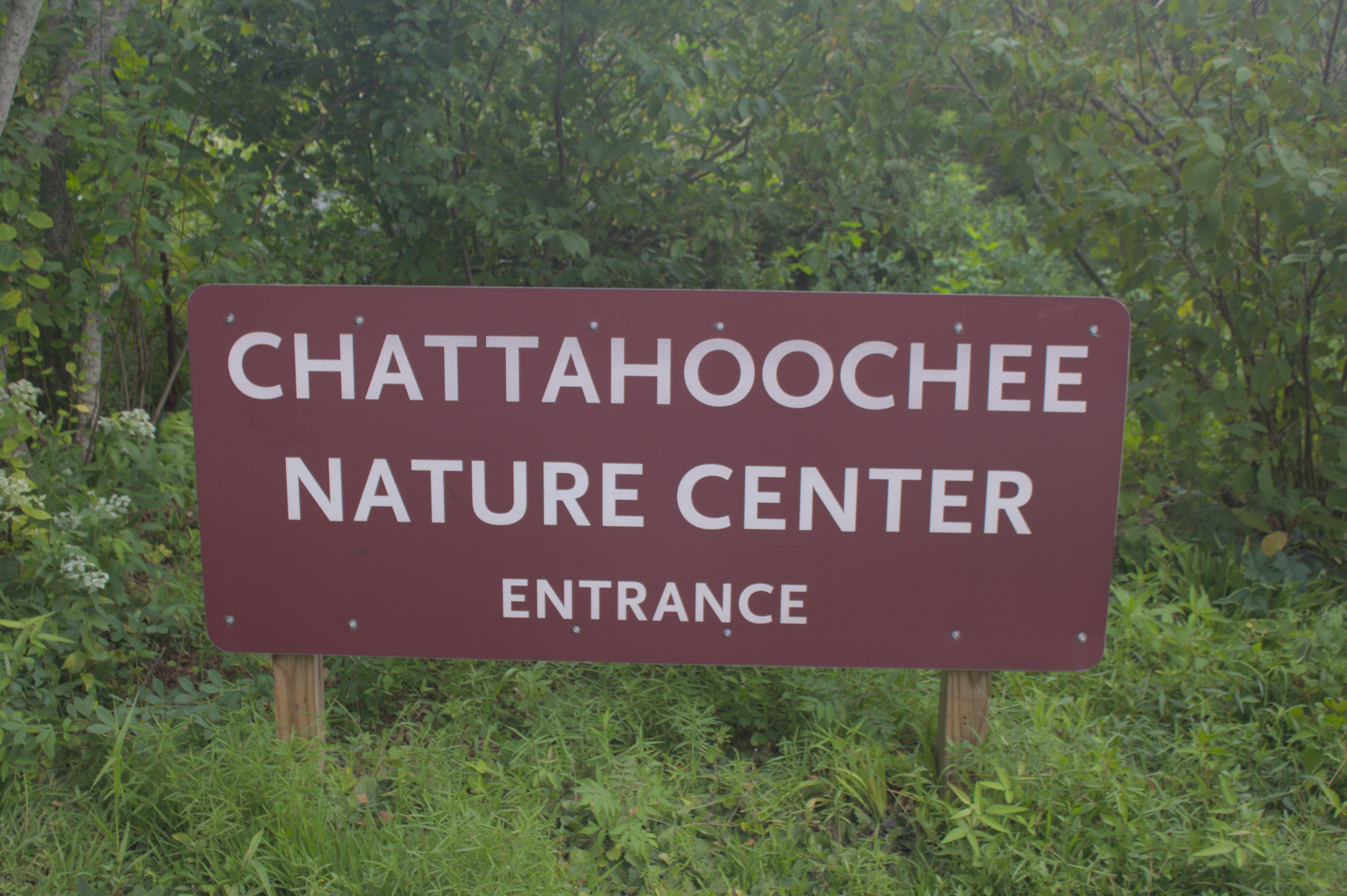
- The entrance sign for the Nature Center
- Interactive map of Chattahoochee Nature Center
- Type: Environmental education center
- Location: 9135 Willeo Road; Roswell, Georgia, USA
- Area: 127 acres (51 ha)
- Designer: John Ripley Forbes
- Website: www.chattnaturecenter.org

Chattahoochee Nature Center is a private, non-profit environmental education facility in Roswell, Georgia. Located on 127 acres (0.51 km^{2}) adjacent to the Chattahoochee River, the nature center focuses on educational outreach through the use of live flora and fauna. The mission of Chattahoochee Nature Center is to connect people to nature.

An on-site wildlife clinic operates at the center for the rehabilitation and release of reptiles, amphibians, and birds of prey. Animals that can not be released back into the wild remain on-site or are transferred to other facilities that need them for educational purposes. Many are utilized in displays or for community outreach programs.

Local species of native plants are housed and grown in the center's greenhouse and nursery. You can see native plants throughout the grounds in the gardens and purchase native plants two times a year at the native plant sales. The Unity Garden also provides fresh produce to the North Fulton Community Charities food pantry all year long.

Chattahoochee Nature Center also offers a popular day camp for Summer, Winter, and Spring Breaks. The camp was recently voted Nickelodeon's Parent's Pick, Best Day Camp for Big Kids.

The Nature Center opened its new interpretive center in June 2009. The building, designed by Lord, Aeck & Sargent is LEED-certified, and the exhibits, designed by AldrichPears Associates, bring to life the important, necessary and timely story of understanding and protecting the Chattahoochee River watershed. The Center houses exciting experiential exhibits, a 65-seat high-definition theater, a rooftop terrace garden for community activities and a Nature Exchange.

== See also ==
- John Ripley Forbes
- Nature Exchange
