= Interpretive planning =

Planning to communicate messages for informal learning-based institutions and other sites

Interpretive planning is an initial step in the planning and design process for informal learning-based institutions like museums, zoos, science centers, nature centers, botanical gardens, heritage sites, parks and other cultural facilities where interpretation is used to communicate messages, stories, information and experiences. It is a decision-making process that blends management needs and resource considerations with visitor needs and desires to determine the most effective way to communicate a message to a targeted audience.

Interpretation at informal learning institutions builds on Freeman Tilden’s principles of interpretation, focusing especially on relating content in a meaningful way to a visitor's own experience, provoking emotion, thought or further inquiry into a subject. The communication goals of interpretation at mission-based institutions are based on achieving previously specified outcomes. Most interpretive plans are based on a thematic approach to interpretation, and therefore, place emphasis on which themes are important to communicate to various audiences. Interpretive planning may also guide how audiences will react to and interact with a particular site or exhibit.

An interpretive plan establishes these specific goals for an institution's market(s) and builds a structured vision of how to achieve them by communicating to an audience through appropriate and meaningful experiences. It combines developing, organizing and analyzing content into relevant and engaging messages, with creating exciting ways for visitors to experience this content. An interpretive plan establishes the communication process, through which meanings and relationships of the cultural and natural world, past and present, are revealed to a visitor through experiences with objects, artifacts, landscapes, sites, exhibits and people.

To effectively engage a visitor and achieve these objectives, as well as any other institutional objectives and requirements (financial, operational, environmental, etc.), an interpretive plan is built through addressing the following issues:

1. Why do you want to interpret something?
2. Who should be involved in the interpretive process?
3. What are you interpreting?
4. Who you are interpreting for?
5. What messages do you want to communicate?
6. What are your specific objectives?
7. What media will you use?
8. How will your interpretation be implemented?
9. How will it be evaluated?
10. How will it be maintained?

Using the questions above, and others, an interpretation plan is often written in conversation between interpretive specialists and other heritage personnel such as curators, educators, front-of-house staff and site management using a collaborative approach to make decisions. The resulting product, often written in the form of a document, provides a vision for the future of interpretation, education, and visitor experience opportunities. It identifies and analyzes interpretation, education, and visitor experience goals and issues and recommends the most effective, efficient, and practical ways to address those goals and issues. The plan guides the further design and development of the project, becoming a resource for architecture, exhibit development and fundraising.
