= Sculpture trail =

Trail connecting artworks

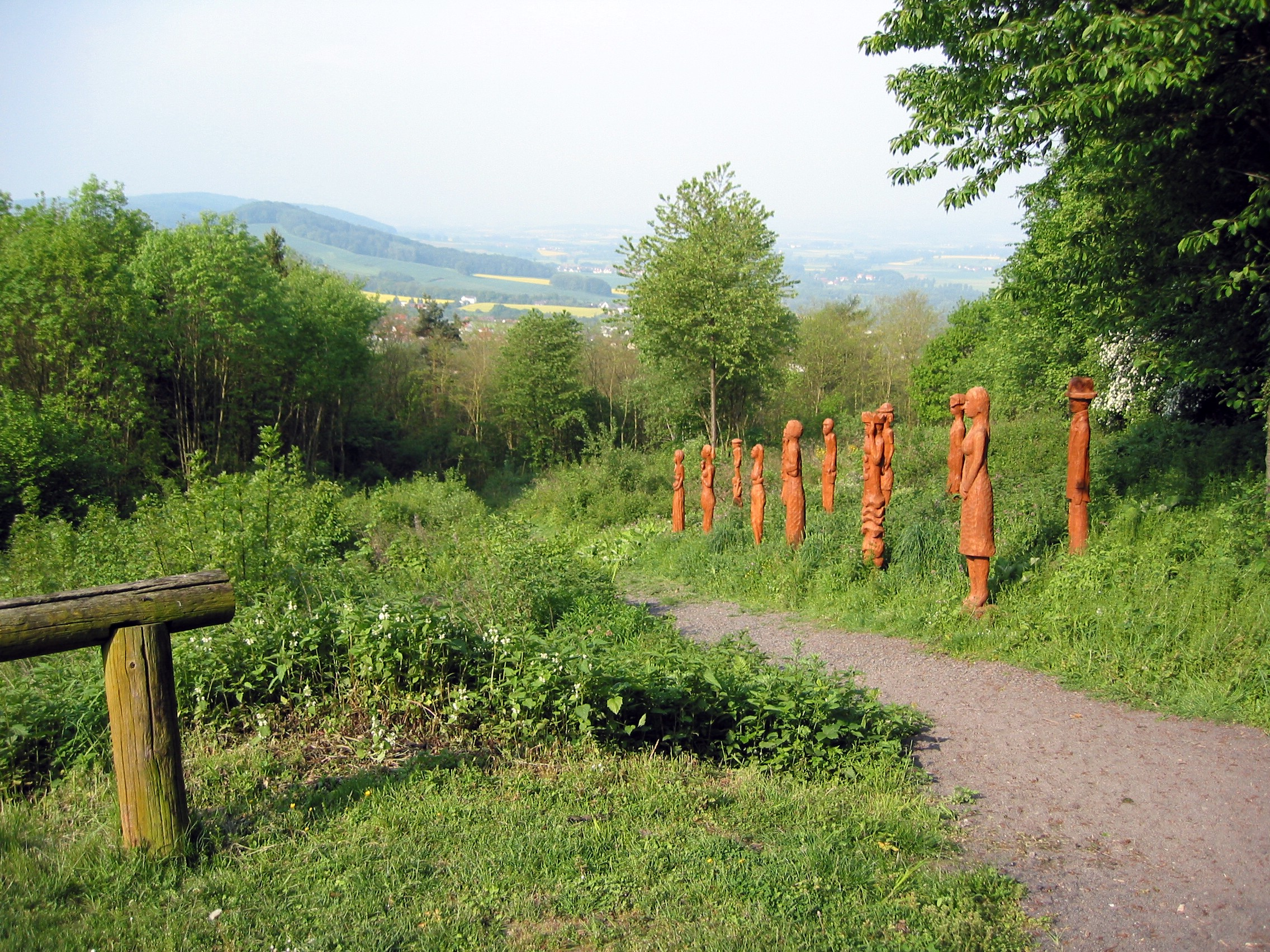
The Kunstwanderweg Heiligenberg, a sculpture trail in Hesse, Germany.

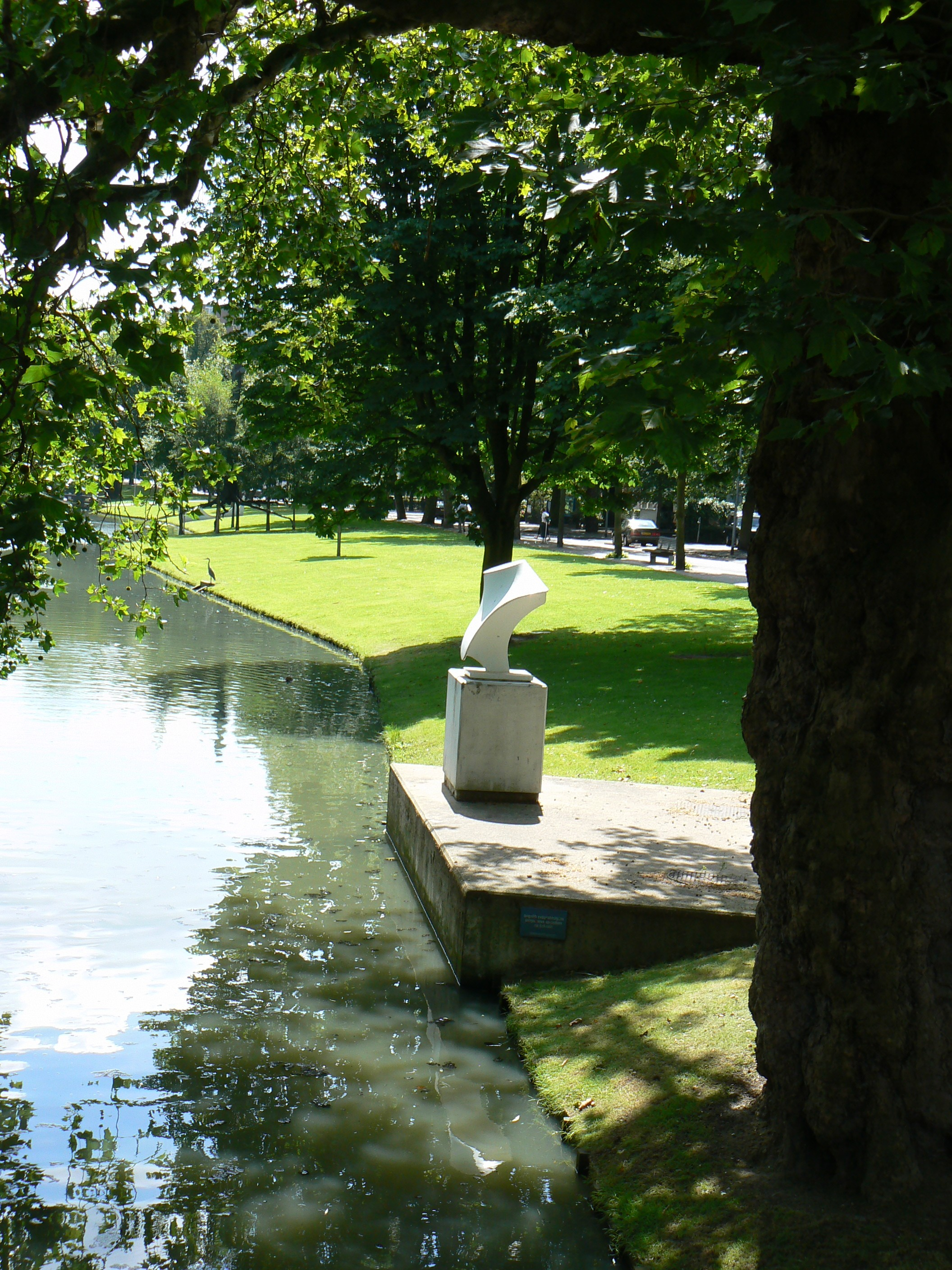
Sculpture on the Rotterdam Centrum sculpture walk, the Netherlands.

A sculpture trail - also known as "a culture walk" or "art trail" - is a walkway through open-air galleries of outdoor sculptures along a defined route with sequenced viewings encountered from planned preview and principal sight lines.

== Settings ==
Often the distinct walkway is one choice among other less structured ways of exploring intimate sculpture gardens, larger sculpture parks and expansive environmental art sites. They are often disabled and wheelchair accessible routes offering viewing and experiencing the art for many.

Sculptural works of land art and larger site-specific outdoor installation art, especially in fragile natural habitats, use sculpture trails for low-impact accessibility. Some culture walks have sculptor-in-residence programs for creating new temporary or permanent works.

Sculpture trail settings can range from urban parks and private estates, through art museum gardens, to large regional open space and art park sites, with walkways giving access to the sculptures.

== Examples ==
Sculpture by the Sea is a free annual 2 kilometres (1.2 mi) outdoor sculpture walk that goes from Bronte Beach to Bondi Beach via Tamarama Beach.

== See also ==
- Independent public art
- Land art
- Public art
- Spirit of place
- Cultural tourism
