= Freeman Tilden =

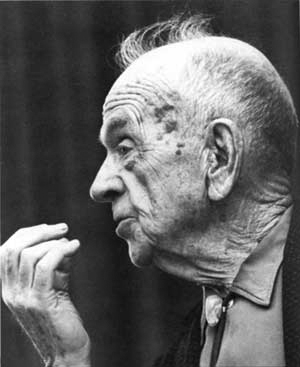
Freeman Tilden.

Freeman Tilden (August 22, 1883 – May 13, 1980) was one of the first people to set down the principles and theories of heritage interpretation in his 1957 book, Interpreting Our Heritage.

Tilden was born in Malden, Massachusetts, and developed his writing skills as a newspaper reporter.

His work with the United States National Park Service (NPS) inspired generations of interpreters across the world and continues to be a definitive text for the discipline. According to thematic interpretation expert, Sam H. Ham, Tilden's quotation on page 38 of Interpreting Our Heritage (which was taken from a US National Park Service administrative manual) has become one of the most cited phrases in the interpretation literature worldwide:

Through interpretation, understanding; through understanding, appreciation; through appreciation, protection.

== Legacy ==
Tilden is the namesake for the NPS's annual Freeman Tilden Award, awarded regionally for excellence in interpretation.

== Works ==
- Second Wind: the Plain Truth About Going Back to the Land, 1917
- Khaki: How Tredick Got Into the War, 1918
- Mr. Podd, 1923
- A World In Debt, 1936
- Interpreting Our Heritage, 1957
- The State Parks: their meaning in American life, 1962
- Following the Frontier With F. Jay Haynes, Pioneer Photographer Of the Old West, 1964
- The National Parks and What they mean to you and me, 1968
