= Exhibit design =

Process of developing an exhibit

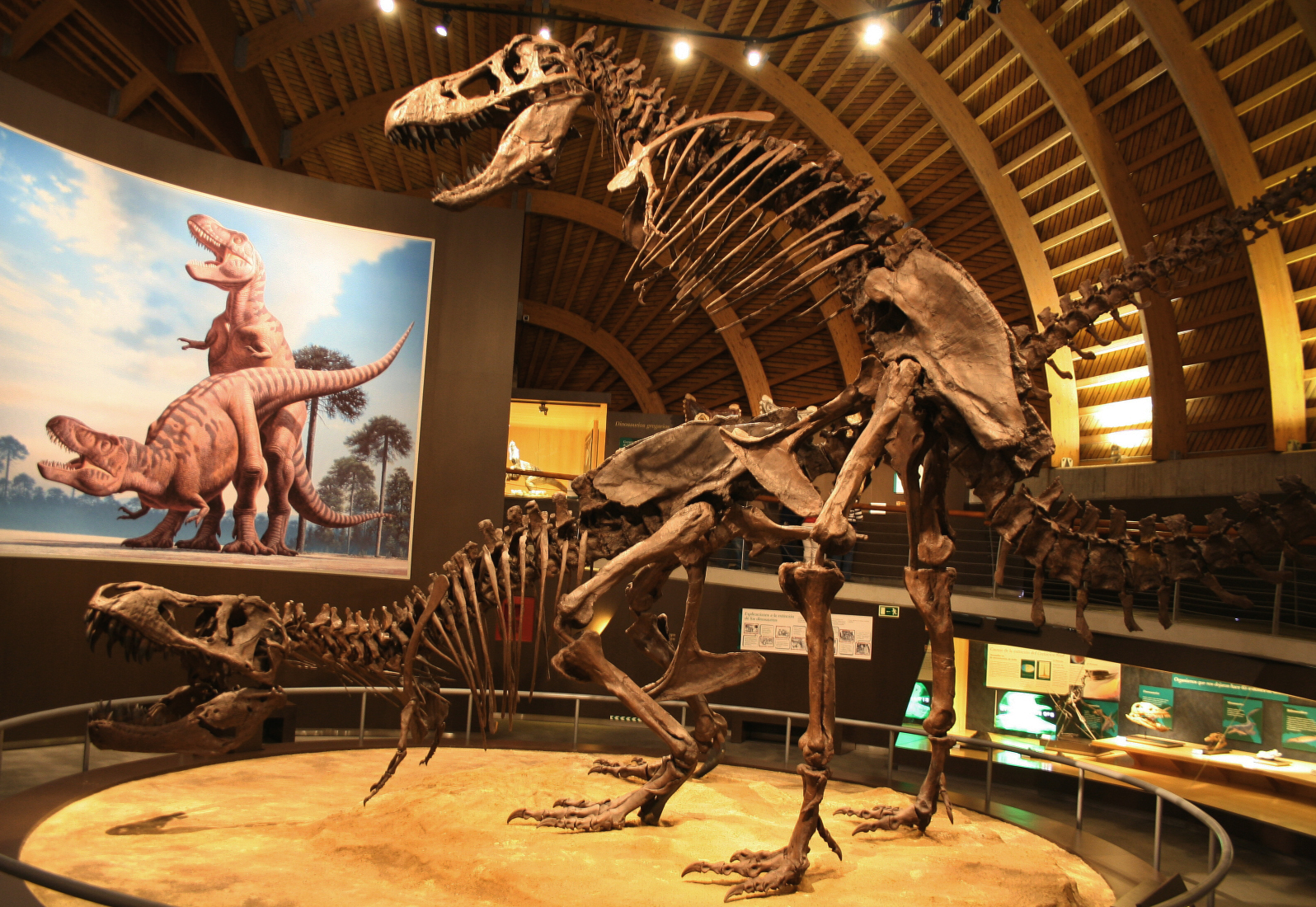
Tyrannosaurus fossil exhibit

Exhibit design (or exhibition design) is the process of developing an exhibit—from a concept through to a physical, three-dimensional exhibition. It is a continually evolving field, drawing on innovative, creative, and practical solutions to the challenge of developing communicative environments that 'tell a story' in a three-dimensional space.

There are many people who collaborate to design exhibits such as directors, curators, exhibition designers, and technicians. These positions have great importance because how they design will affects how people learn. Learning is a byproduct of attention, so first the designers must capture the visitors attention.

A good exhibition designer will consider the whole environment in which a story is being interpreted rather than just concentrating on individual exhibits. Some other things designers must consider are the space allotted for the display, precautions to protect what is being displayed, and what they are displaying. For example a painting, a mask, and a diamond will not be displayed the same way. Taking into account with artifacts culture and history is also important because every time the artifact is displayed in a new context it reinterprets them.

== Description ==
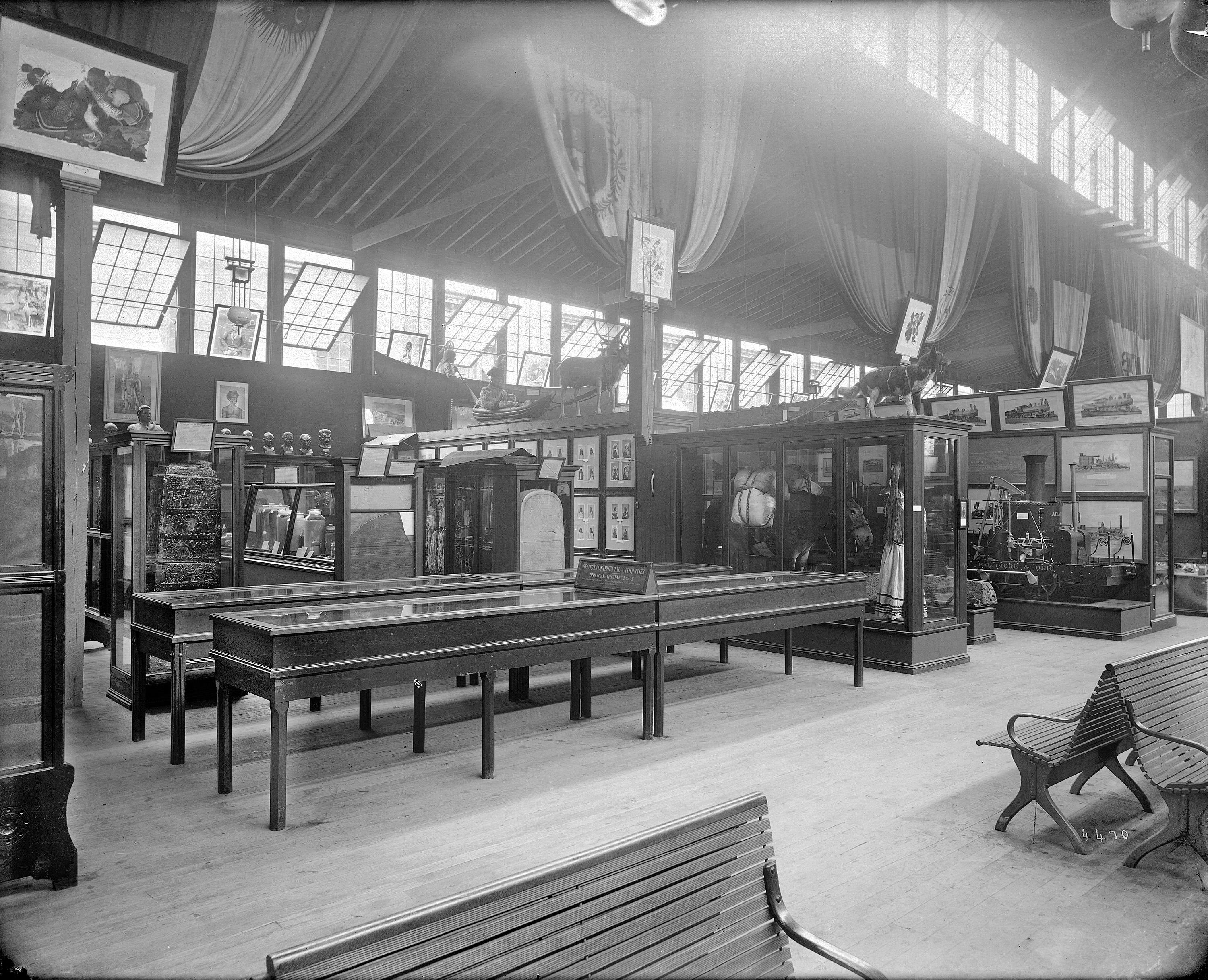
'Cabinet of Curiosities' style of display in 1888

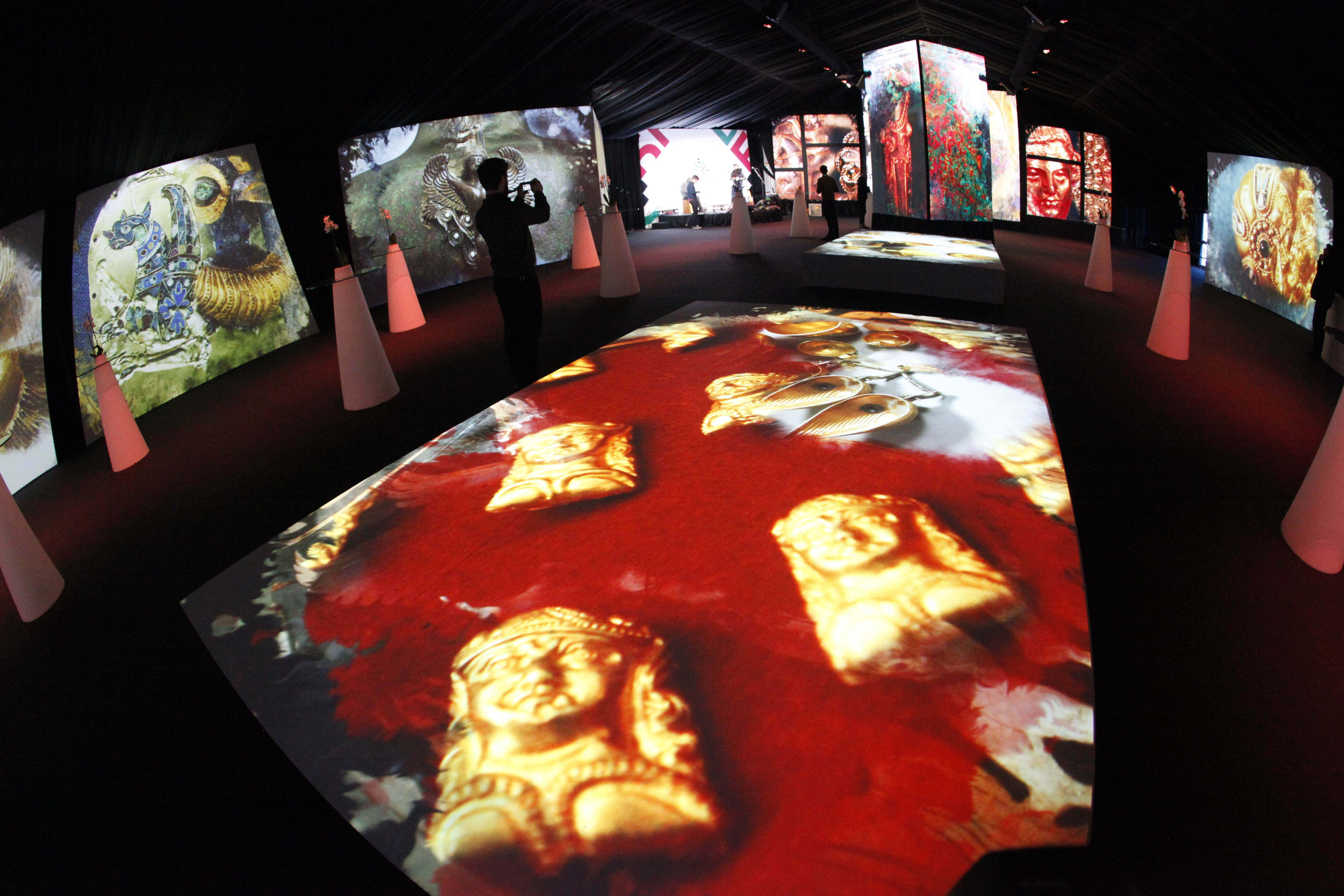
Interactive Exhibition

Exhibit design is a collaborative process, integrating the disciplines of architecture, landscape architecture, graphic design, audiovisual engineering, digital media, lighting, interior design, and content development to develop an audience experience that interprets information, involves and engages a user and influences their understanding of a subject. There are many different types of exhibit, ranging from museum exhibitions, to retail and trades show spaces, to themed attractions, zoos, and visitor centers. All types of exhibits aim to communicate a message through engaging their audiences in meaningful and compelling interactions.

Exhibit designers (or exhibition designers) use a wide range of technologies and techniques to develop experiences that will resonate with diverse audiences–enabling these targeted audiences to access the messages, stories and objects of an exhibit.

The exhibit design process builds on a conceptual or interpretive plan for an exhibit, determining the most effective, engaging and appropriate methods of communicating a message or telling a story. The process will often mirror the architectural process or schedule, moving from conceptual plan, through schematic design, design development, contract document, fabrication, and installation. The first phases establish a thematic direction and develop creative and appropriate design solutions to achieve the interpretive and communication goals of the exhibit. The latter phases employ technical expertise in translating the visual language of the designs into detailed documents that provide all the specifications required to fabricate and install an exhibit.

Exhibition design in different parts of the world are influenced by the local culture as well as the availability of materials. Exhibition design in Europe is considered as a meeting place for relationship building while in North America energy is spent on creating a sense of place and building community.

One of the major shifts in museum and exhibit design in the last decade has been a focus on visitor experience. By identifying the five types of museum visitors and their needs and expectations, museums can design their exhibits to give a positive visitor experience. Participatory activities are also becoming more popular, Nina Simon has done research describing and identifying themes and trends in museums that will attract visitors and educate them in fun and engaging ways.

How an exhibit is designed can greatly persuade the visitors comprehension of artifacts. The use of colors, lighting, graphics, guidance systems or materials can dramatize the display or help create a central theme to aid the presentation of a narrative. The use of new interactive technology can increase the comprehension of facts. New full-body or multi-user interactive technology can help engage visitors in fun activities that support exploratory learning. Utilizing this technology can make museums more fun and less intimidating. It also encourages learning new ideas while working with others in a social setting. The use of technology in a museum setting goes further than the four walls of the museum itself. By adding the exhibits to a digital platform it allows others who are unable to visit the museum in person to still learn from the display. Awareness and use of digital access to exhibits was increased due to the COVID-19 pandemic and resulting lockdowns which prohibited access to museums. This practice is also used to create digital displays for artifacts sitting in storage.

== Careers ==
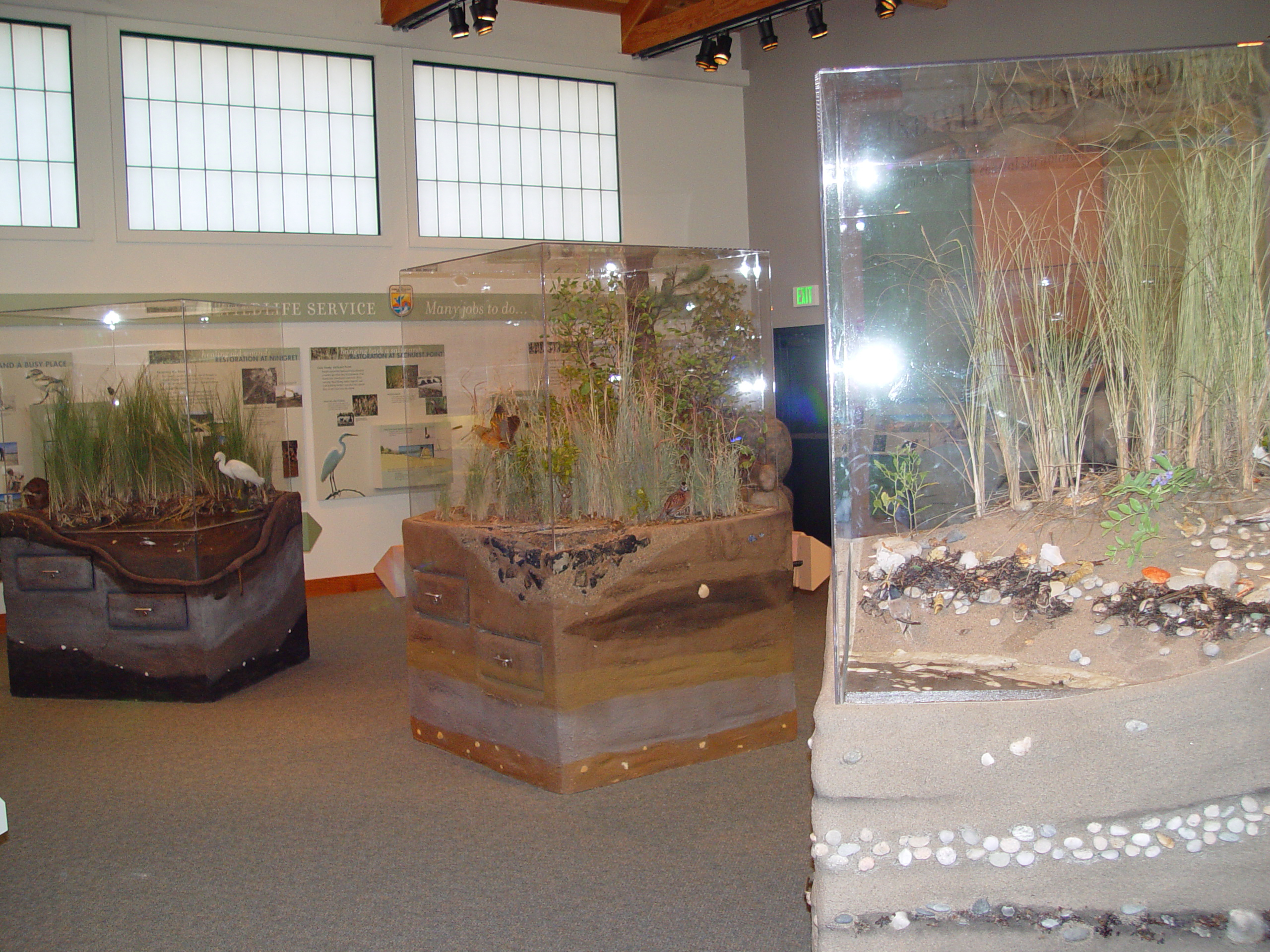
Display enclosed in glass to protect the contents held within

Some positions require a certain level of education, such as a postgraduate qualification/museum diploma. Some positions also require certain skills such as collections management, administration, or research and publication experience. Professionals who design exhibits need to take into account the core mission of the organization as well as audience expectations.

Throughout the planning and design process, exhibit designers work closely with graphic designers, content specialists, architects, fabricators, technical specialists, and audiovisual experts. In the case of museums and other mission-based institutions, exhibit designers also work with community members, government agencies, and partner organizations.
