= Heritage interpretation =

Communication of information to visitors of parks, museums and other sites

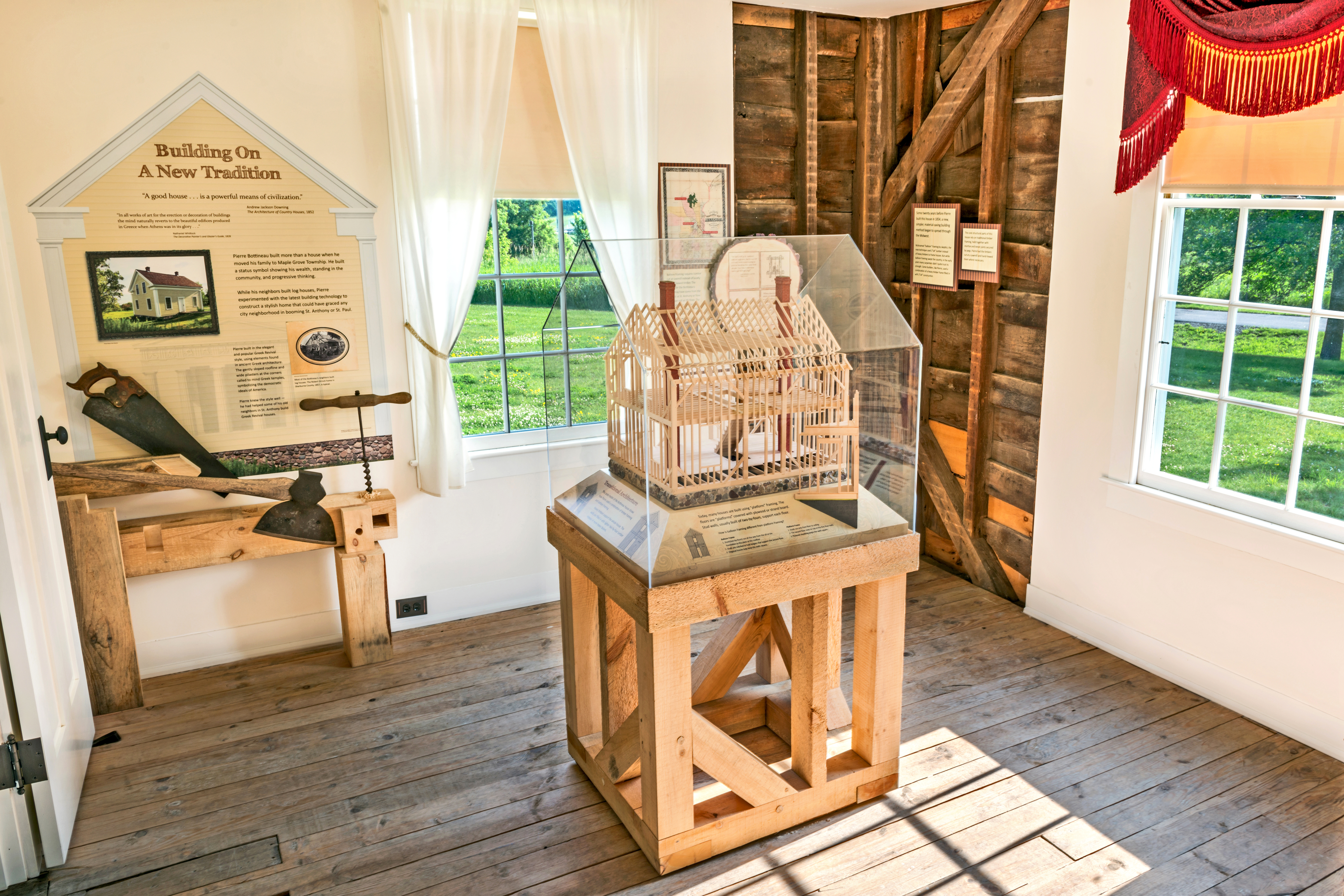
Exhibit showing construction techniques used to build a historic house

Heritage interpretation is the way museums, parks, and heritage sites help people understand the meaning of places, objects, and stories. It explains why cultural, natural, and historical resources matter and how they connect to human experiences. Through education, communication, and storytelling, interpretation helps visitors understand the relationships between people, the environment, and the past.

== Definition and scope ==
Heritage interpretation is a process of communication that helps visitors understand and find meaning in cultural, natural, and historical resources. It includes all the ways information is presented to visitors at sites such as museums, parks, or science centers. The process explains the origin, nature, and purpose of objects, sites, and phenomena through personal and non-personal methods. Personal methods include guided tours, talks, and performances, while non-personal methods include exhibits, interpretive signage, brochures, and digital media.

== Venues and methods ==
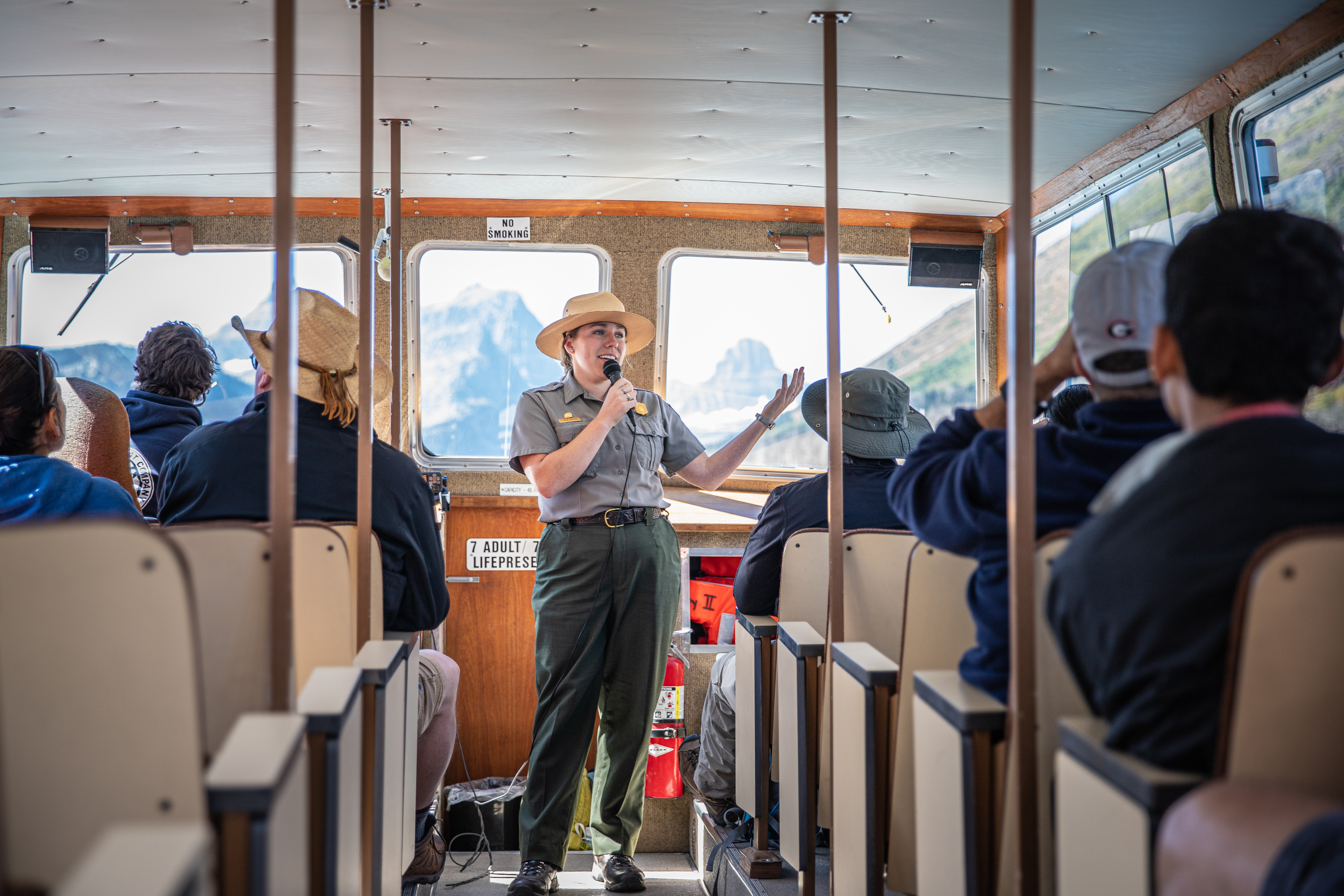
National Park Ranger leading a tour by boat

Interpretation may take place at museums, historic sites, parks, art galleries, zoos, botanical gardens, aquariums, and nature reserves. It may also occur in interpretation centers that specialize in communicating the significance of resources. The process can include guided walks, interpretive displays, theatrical presentations, or interactive installations. Interpretive planning is the structured process used to organize and design interpretive programs. The thematic approach to interpretation promoted by Sam Ham, the National Association for Interpretation, and the U.S. National Park Service is a common professional standard.

== Practitioners and techniques ==
The people who practice heritage interpretation may include park rangers, guides, naturalists, actors (who may wear period dress and do reenactments), museum curators, natural and cultural interpretive specialists, interpretation officers, heritage communicators, docents, educators, visitor services staff, interpreters or a host of other titles. The interpretive process is often assisted by new technologies such as visualization techniques.

== Purpose and impact ==
The main goal of heritage interpretation is to deepen the visitor experience by helping people understand the meaning of the site or object they are exploring and relate it to their own lives. Effective interpretation weaves thematic stories that encourage visitors to think about their experiences and to connect new information to what they already know. According to researcher Gianna Moscardo, interpretation can help develop "mindful visitors," who observe carefully and reflect on what they see. Government agencies and nonprofit organizations often use interpretation to encourage environmental stewardship and cultural awareness.

== Definitions in practice ==
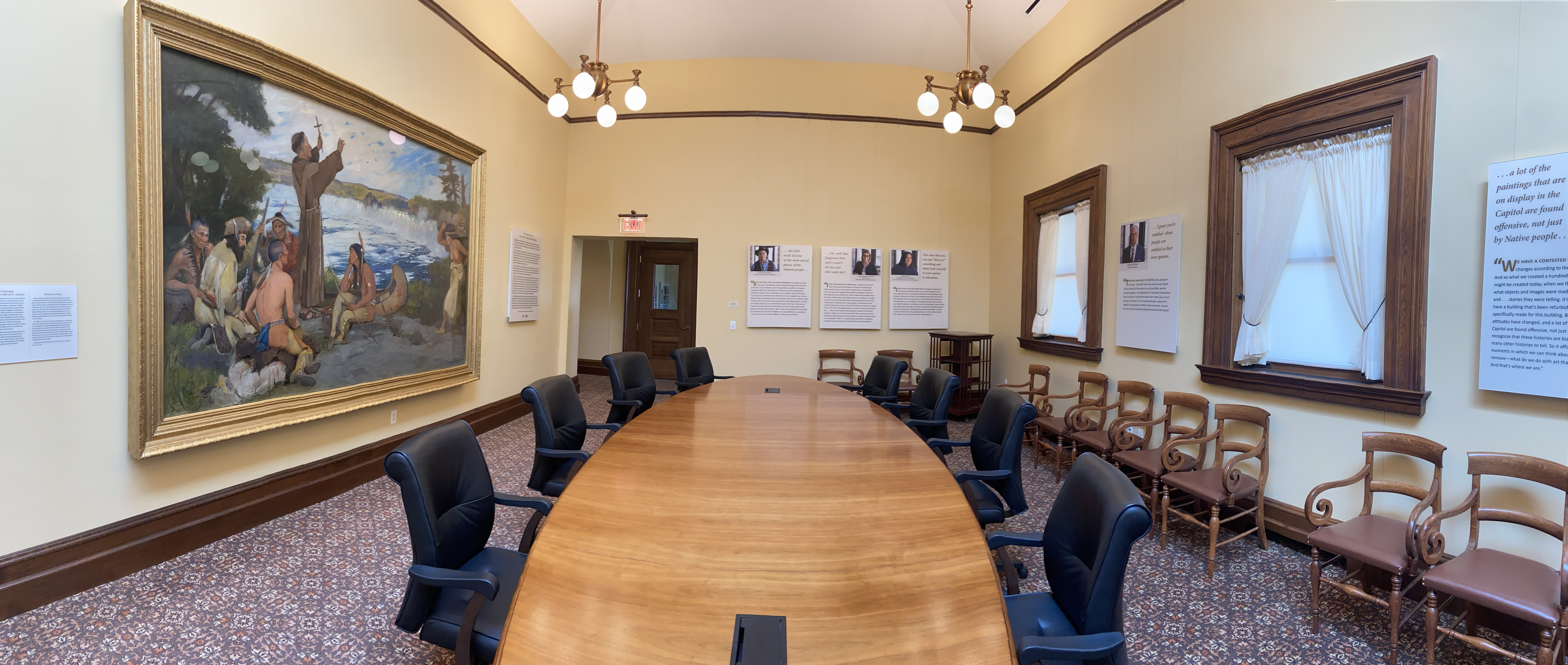
'Father Hennepin Discovering the Falls of St. Anthony' with new panels interpreting the 1905 painting

Several organizations have defined heritage interpretation in similar terms. Freeman Tilden for the US National Park Service describes it as an educational activity that reveals meaning and relationships through firsthand experience rather than simple information. Interpretation Canada sees heritage interpretation as revealing the deeper meanings of heritage through engagement, fostering understanding and appreciation beyond facts. The National Association for Interpretation describes interpretation as purposeful communication that fosters meaningful, inclusive experiences and inspires deeper understanding of the world around us. The Association for Heritage Interpretation sees heritage interpretation as a communication process that transforms information into engaging experiences, revealing meanings and relationships that help people connect with and care for heritage. The International Council on Monuments and Sites includes interpretation as a broad set of activities that build awareness and understanding of cultural heritage, including publications, lectures, and educational programs. The International Centre for the Interpretation and Presentation of World Heritage Sites under UNESCO defines it as a meaning-making process through communication and participation.

== Tilden’s principles ==
In Interpreting Our Heritage (1957), Freeman Tilden set out six guiding principles that remain central to interpretive practice. First, interpretation must relate to the experience of the visitor to have meaning. Second, interpretation is not only information but a process of revelation built upon it. Third, interpretation is a teachable art that combines many forms of expression. Fourth, the main aim is provocation rather than instruction. Fifth, interpretation should present the whole story rather than separate parts. Sixth, interpretation for children should be designed with a distinct approach rather than a simplified version of adult programs.

== See also ==
- Museology
- Environmental education
- Public history
- Interpretive planning
- First-person interpretation
- Thematic interpretation
