= Thematic interpretation =

Research framework

Thematic interpretation is an approach to heritage interpretation originally advocated by Professor William J. Lewis (University of Vermont) and subsequently developed by Professor Sam H. Ham (University of Idaho). In the thematic approach, an interpreter relies on a central theme (i.e., a major point or message) to guide development of a communication activity or device. In presenting the activity or device, the thematic interpreter develops the theme in such a way that it will be highly relevant to an audience. According to studies, presenting a strongly relevant theme greatly increases the likelihood an interpreter will succeed in provoking an audience to think about theme-related issues.

Beginning in the early 2000s, the thematic approach has been adopted widely in persuasive communication campaigns aimed at impacting environmental behaviors, especially those related to energy and water consumption, and in occupational safety and risk communication programs. In the broader fields of sustainable development and risk communication, the term thematic communication (rather than thematic "interpretation") is often used. The two approaches, however, are identical, and both are linked largely to Ham's (1992) book, Environmental Interpretation.

== History ==
The thematic approach to interpretation was popularized in the book Environmental Interpretation (1992) by Dr. Sam H. Ham (University of Idaho) which has become standard reading for many students of interpretation and interpretive tour guiding. Prior to Dr. Ham's book, two additional contributors to the field of Interpretation are its founder, Freeman Tilden and his book, Interpreting Our Heritage (1957) and Dr. Grant W. Sharpe (University of Washington) and his work, Interpreting the Environment.

Ham formally presented the thematic approach for the first time in his 1992 book, wherein he outlined the "EROT" (Enjoyable, Relevant, Organized, Thematic) framework. Drawing heavily on persuasive communication research, Ham refined the EROT framework in the early 2000s and renamed it the TORE model of thematic interpretation. The most detailed presentation of the TORE model is in Interpretation-- Making a difference on purpose which Ham published in 2013.

There are obvious parallels between Ham's view of thematic interpretation and those of Freeman Tilden who is widely considered the founder of the field of interpretation. The most important parallel is that both see interpretation as a process aimed at provoking audiences to do their own thinking and thereby develop their own subjective understanding of the world. This is in contrast to the view that interpretation instructs audiences to know or accept the interpreter's understanding of things.

Both Tilden and Ham appear to be strongly influenced by the views of constructivist learning theorists--with Tilden influenced by John Dewey, and Ham influenced by cognitive constructivist Jean Piaget and social constructivist Lev Vygotsky. In the spirit of constructivist learning theory, Dewey, Piaget, and Vygotsky saw learning as the result of knowledge that is created inside a learner's own head, rather than being "put" there by an educator. Both Tilden, and later, Ham, advocated a very similar view in the field of interpretation. According to both of them, when interpretation is strongly relevant to its audience, it is likely to provoke thinking and elaboration.

== Practice ==
In everyday reality, the practice of thematic interpretation involves theme-based communication by interpretive naturalists, zoo and museum educators, guides, docents, park rangers, and other communicators in natural and cultural settings. Typically interpreters are required to present complex and potentially dry subject matter to non-technical voluntary audiences (often consisting of tourists) in an interesting and engaging way. The thematic approach can involve any method that increases the relevance of an interpreter's theme to an audience, for example, comparisons, analogies and stories that link unfamiliar things to the things an audience already cares about.

== Alternate uses ==
Thematic interpretation also refers to an event in some high school competitive speech leagues such as the California High School Speech Association and the National Christian Forensics and Communications Association. "TIers" present multiple "cuttings" from published works on a common theme; they can be of humorous and/or dramatic intent. The entire speech including an introduction and transitions should not exceed ten minutes. Contestants are judged based on the appropriateness of their selections and their portrayal of the characters. Another defining characteristic of Thematic Interpretation is the use of a single binder, containing the literature, as a prop.

== See also ==
- Environmental education
- Heritage interpretation
