= Learning-by-doing =

Theory of education advocating a hands-on approach

Learning by doing is a theory that places heavy emphasis on student engagement and is a hands-on, task-oriented, process to education. The theory refers to the process in which students actively participate in more practical and imaginative ways of learning. This process distinguishes itself from other learning approaches as it provides many pedagogical advantages to more traditional learning styles, such as those which privilege inert knowledge. Learning by doing is related to other types of learning such as adventure learning, action learning, cooperative learning, experiential learning, peer learning, service-learning, and situated learning.

== Main contributors ==
Much of what is known about the learning by doing theory was thanks to the contributions of historic minds that changed education today. The theory has been expounded and popularized by famous American philosopher and educational crusader John Dewey and Brazilian pedagogue Paulo Freire.

Dewey, considered as one of the founding fathers of modern-day functional psychology, implemented this idea by setting up the University of Chicago Laboratory School. His views have been important in establishing practices of progressive education. He was an advocate for progressive education as opposed to traditional education. Dewey believed that effective learning is done through interactions and that school is a social institution where these interactions take place. In an ideal classroom in which learning by doing is implemented, the classroom is a space for children to learn and problem solve as a community in their own way, at their own pace, through teacher instructions that take the children into consideration. This fosters a healthy and responsive learning community where students actively engage in the learning process. Learning by doing not only focuses on academic growth, but social, intellectual, emotional, physical, and spiritual growth.

Freire on the other hand, highlighted the important role of the individual development seeking to generate awareness and nurture critical skills based on his most influential pieces known as Pedagogy of the Oppressed. Dewey advocated for education as a means of preserving democracy and sound government because he was raised in advanced and civilized New York City. While in Brazil during the dictatorship, Freire experienced crushing poverty and a wretched lifestyle. Therefore, he advocated for education as a means of awareness and liberation from the problems associated with underdevelopment. Thus resulting these experiences to be the contributing factor to how he would construct his ideas on education.

== Other contributors ==
Besides Freire and Dewey there were other key contributors to the theory of learning by doing, including Richard DuFour, who adopted and applied it to the development of professional learning communities. Richard DuFour was an education consultant and author who wanted to improve the education system in America. He was a leading voice in the movement to improve schools through professional learning communities, in which teachers come together to analyze and improve their classroom practice.

Despite being born blind it did not stop Jerome Bruner from becoming successful, as he was able to earn a PhD in psychology and taught at Harvard, Oxford and New York universities. Bruner was always focused on the American educational system and finding ways to improve it. He introduced the concepts of discovery learning and spiral curriculum. Discovery learning is depicted as a way for students to learn the given curriculum on their own accord and built upon it with their experiences. Spiral learning was Bruner's idea that similar topics can be taught to any age, but according to the stage of thought.

David Kolb drew inspiration from Kurt Lewin, John Dewey, and Jean Piaget to create an experiential learning model. Kolb believed that effective learners need to have concrete experience abilities (CE), reflective observation abilities (RO), abstract conceptualization (AC), and active experimentation (AE) abilities. Concrete experience is being involved and actively engaged in new experiences. Reflective observation is asking questions and discussing the experience. Abstract conceptualization is when the learner thinks and starts to make conclusions. Active experimentation is reapplying their conclusions to the task at hand to make decisions and solve problems. The American economist and mathematician Kenneth Arrow highlights the importance of learning by doing as a means of increasing productivity. In the article he writes that "one empirical generalization is so clear that all schools of thought must accept it, although they interpret it in different fashions: learning is the product of experience. learning can only take place throughout the attempt to solve a problem and therefore only takes place during activity." - Kenneth J. Arrow (The Economic Implications of Learning by Doing).

== Sherlock I & II ==
Sherlock, developed by Alan M. Lesgold and Sherrie P. Gott, is an intelligent tutoring system designed to help airmen understand cognitive tasks in air force electronics. Sherlock's speedy and efficient approach provides a means of practicing with support and feedback. Sherlock provides help when a student loses track of what they have done. This help includes hints when a student does not know how to proceed to overcome knowledge gaps and critical insights and feedback to help the student continue towards efficient performance. Sherlock tracks the student's work using two models:

- Competence model: How well each goal has been achieved. Any divergence of student performance from the predictions can be considered in updating the student's competence model.
- Performance model: How well the student is expected to do at each point of the abstracted problem space. Influences how Sherlock will be providing help at specific points in a problem
  - Based on the student's expected performance, the performance model provides hints. The hints come in the form of: Action, Outcome, Conclusion, and Option
    - Level 1: First time asking a hint. Recapitulation hint
    - Level 2: Good Job rating
    - Level 3: Okay rating
    - Level 4: Bad rating
    - Additional requests result in higher level hints until the problem is solved. If there are no more Conclusion hints, Option hints will be provided.

== An empirical study ==
According to the study "Learning by Doing: An Empirical Study of Active Teaching Techniques", it was suggested that the passive method is not the most effective technique to promote successful engagement within a learning environment. This study, published in 2011 by Jana Hackathorn, Erin D. Solomon, Kate L. Blankmeyer, Rachel E. Tenniel, and Amy M. Garczyński, presented four teaching techniques: lecture, demonstrations, discussions, and in-class activities by measuring the effectiveness of each to prove the one which stands out the most. The contemporary research advocates have stated that stimulating the energy of the classroom could serve a more effective purpose compared to the traditional lecture.

Lecture

Lecture refers to the phrase "information dump", which means the majority of the class time is taken up by receiving loads of details/ideas which does not allow individuals to interact with the environment while the lessons taken from the class generally eradicates the opportunities of mastering the informative exams. The lack of performing a task limits the chance of improvement. Sometimes the lectures consist of the constructs that provide a sense of support for comprehending the new topics which are introduced.

Hypothesis: For lecture, although it was considered the least effective method of retaining knowledge in an intelligible manner, it could be considered somewhat constructive when it comes to utilizing vocabulary terms. The official hypothesis signifies that the percentage of correct answers on the knowledge level questions would be drastically higher than the comprehension questions.

Demonstrations

Demonstrations are clear presentations performed by individuals in the classroom as a means of showing how something works out. The "demonstrations" technique serves an important principle within the classroom as it appears as more "active" for students to get the chance of "first-hand" experiment. The demonstration process engages several students to remain focused upon the occurrence in front of them with the limit of parameters/specific principles.

Hypothesis: The evidence of DEMOS increasing the attention is very minimal as it limits the number of students who are allowed to perform the given task. Therefore, it was hypothesized that the constructs who use the DEMOS technique, students would score less on the knowledge and application and score higher on the comprehension section.

Discussions

Discussions refers to a hybrid form of teaching; students give out information while they also receive from their peers and teachers. This is displayed as the significant core principle of active engagement. The discussions present a stronger sense of knowledge as it allows people to think about what others have stated and then build upon those conceptions mentioned.

Hypothesis: The discussion approach of learning is a more collaborative communication which involves all students in the classroom. The analytical thesis that was made denotes the effectiveness of comprehension level learning improving within this sort of essence which then leads to the drop of knowledge/application related answers turning out accurate during the empirical study.

In-class activities

In-class activities are known as the most active form of learning in a classroom environment. Whether individuals work by themselves and then share with their peers and teachers or in large groups that consist of circulating different ideas into one, students are able to visualize the "phenomena" unraveling. This phenomenon could then be utilized in an empirical environment. In some cases, students may seem perplexed by the complexity of topics which could be comprehensible through a form of activities.

Hypothesis: In class activities allow students to exploit and practice administering information to one self for effectual comprehension. Therefore, it was hypothesized that constructs that utilized the ICA method, the students would perform effectively on both comprehension and application level questions rather than the knowledge ones.

=== The Initial Method ===
For the performance of proving which method is the most effective, various constructs were instructed to teach a social psychology course throughout a certain period of time. The learning was assessed through the six quizzes and four exams which presented the three constructs of Bloom's intelligible level.

Participants

The participants of this empirical study consisted of 18 men and 33 women who had a GPA of 3.31. About 46% of students were psychology majors and 28% were double majoring in psychology.

The Process

The procedure of the study consisted of a duration of an entire semester. The constructs of each method were not forced upon the instructors, rather they had free will. The assistants who were unaware of the hypotheses were trained before the start of the semester to distinguish between the techniques. In addition there were two researchers that created the quizzes, and were supervised nearly every three weeks. The quizzes which were assigned had a variety of alternatives such as multiple choice, true and false and short response questions. Each construct of the quiz had three questions of each level of Bloom's taxonomy. The instructors over the duration of the semester created the four complex exams which ended up being a part of the student's overall grade.

Measures

Each quiz question consisted of answers that were either marked accurate or inaccurate(no half credit given). The exam grades were just a part of the class syllabus. The same criteria of grading was utilized to mark the exam with a slight difference; the multiple choice was either graded as completely correct or completely incorrect but the short response questions consisted of partial credit. Blank answers were not given any sort of credit.

Results

In order to scrutinize each of the techniques such as lectures, demonstrations, discussions and in class activities, the four repeated measures of ANOVAs were utilized to differentiate the results in between the three levels of Bloom's taxonomy.Using the Mauchly's test it was identified that for the LECT approach, the correct scores on the knowledge level computation turned out to be much lower than comprehension and application. The hypothesis was completely inaccurate. For the DEMO approach, the Mauchly's test significantly indicated that scores on the application level computation were higher than knowledge and somewhat higher than comprehension. The hypothesis was partially accurate. Although the third hypothesis emphasizes that DISC would be most effective for comprehension level computation, this was not accurate according to the results. The results portrayed that the scores on both knowledge and application were significantly higher than comprehension. For the final approach, the results for ICA displayed that scores on comprehension and application were higher than knowledge. This hypothesis turned out to be fully accurate.

Closing Remarks

For the first hypothesis, it was first assumed that the lecture technique would be effective upon the knowledge leveled questions but it was proven wrong with the Mauchly's test. Despite the fact that lectures are known to increase comprehensible skill sets and application related principles, the consciousness of retaining content throughout the semester could be quite challenging. Students tend to complain about the lack of entertainment and knowledge gained at the end of the day. For the second hypothesis of demonstrations being the most efficient for comprehension purposes. The actuality of demonstrations allowing students to apply the information they retain was quite astonishing due to the fact that there are limitations of students who could hands on experience the study while others just sit there and observe. The discussion technique was surprisingly not efficient for comprehending lessons; rather, it was more effective for increasing knowledge and applying information. Although individuals could argue that in a discussion, students tend to retain more information through the sense of understanding one another, this assumption was proven otherwise. In the recent research, it was discovered that students could misguide one another with falsity of information in which the instructor would have to reintegrate the truth to eradicate the misstatement. In certain circumstances, proving the accurate details could be challenging as the false information has been introduced to the students already. The results of the fourth and final hypothesis were notably accurate; it was determined that both comprehension and application level questions were effective upon the increase of mastering the information to a high extent. To conclude, the statement of in class activities being the most efficient for utilizing new facts to further apply it to the real world.

== See also ==
- 4-H
- Active learning
- Computers in the classroom
- Computational education
- Computer-based mathematics education
- List of educational software
- List of online educational resources
- Experiential learning
- Learning by teaching
- Project-based learning
- Procedural knowledge
- Trial and error
- Upskilling
- Vocational education
