= International School of Düsseldorf =

International School of Düsseldorf e.V.
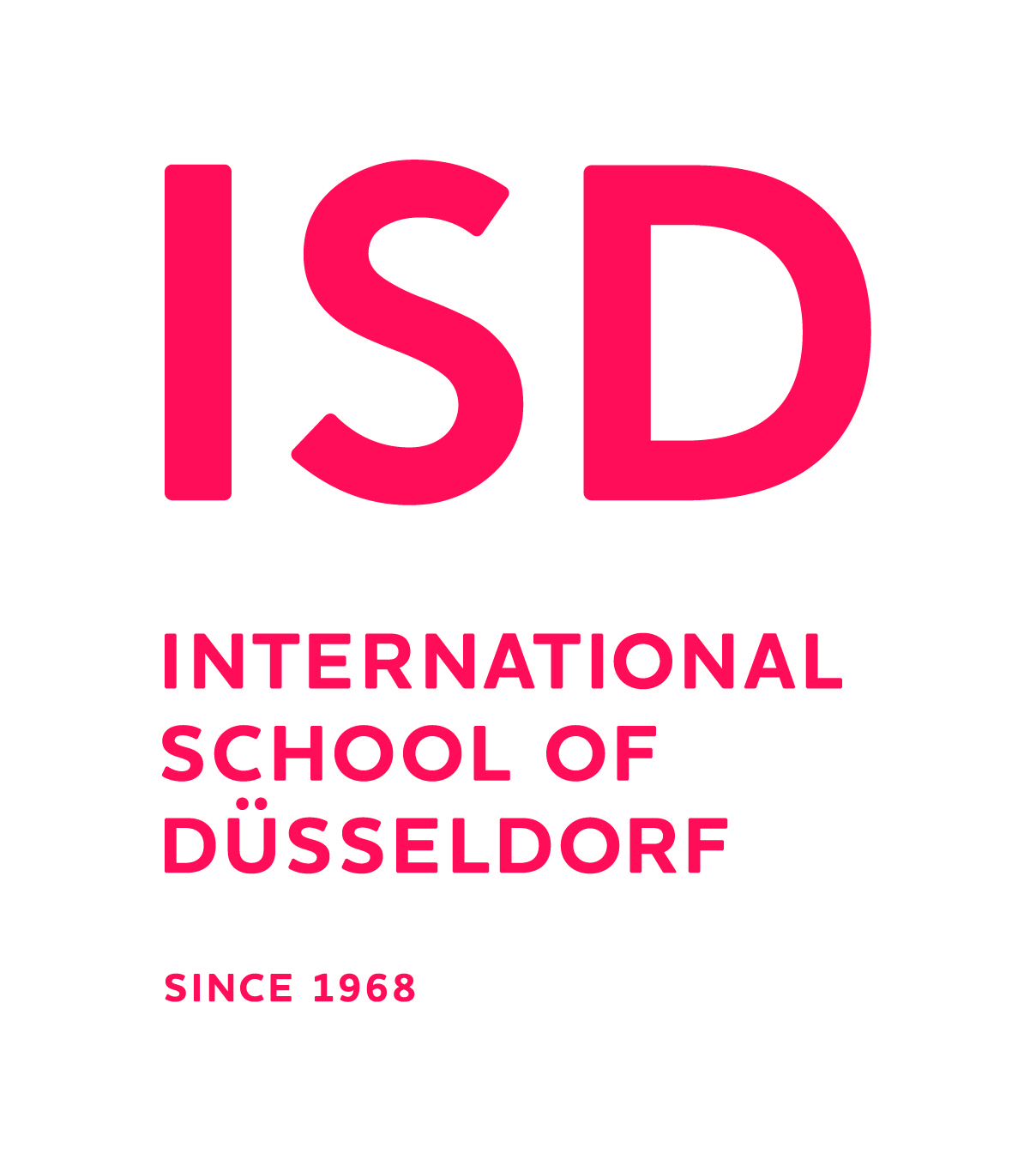

Location
- Niederrheinstrasse 336; Düsseldorf, North Rhine-Westphalia; Germany

Information
- Type: International Education in English, Nonprofit School, IB School
- Established: 1968
- Campus Director: Frank Tschan
- Grades: Pre-K–12
- Enrollment: 1,300
- Color: Red White
- Mascot: Lion
- Website: https://www.isdedu.de/

The International School of Düsseldorf e.V. (ISD) is a nonprofit, independent, coeducational day school located in Kaiserswerth, Germany, a historic suburb of Düsseldorf. (A)ISD was founded in 1968 as the American International School of Düsseldorf, an English language school to meet the needs of non-military expatriate families. In 1977, it became the 65th school worldwide authorized to award the International Baccalaureate (IB) diploma. In 1986, the school changed its name to the International School of Düsseldorf.

ISD is an IB World School offering the Primary Years Program (PYP), Middle Years Program (MYP), and the IB Diploma Program (DP). ISD is accredited by the Council of International Schools (CIS), the International Baccalaureate Organization (IBO), the State of North Rhine-Westphalia, and the New England Association of Schools & Colleges (NEASC).

There are currently approximately 1,300 students enrolled at ISD from Pre-K to Grade 12. The majority of students are German (22%), American (14%), Japanese (9%), British (6%), Dutch (6%), Chinese (5%) and Spanish (4%). Instruction is in English, with German, Spanish, French and Japanese offered as part of the curriculum. As many as 12 other mother tongue languages are offered as part of the after school activities program.

The majority of the teachers at ISD are hired overseas, primarily from the US, Canada, and the UK.

The 19-acre campus includes three libraries/media centers, a 400-seat theater, three cafeterias, seven science labs, a design technology center, outdoor learning centers, dance and music rooms, two gyms, functional fitness center and sports fields.

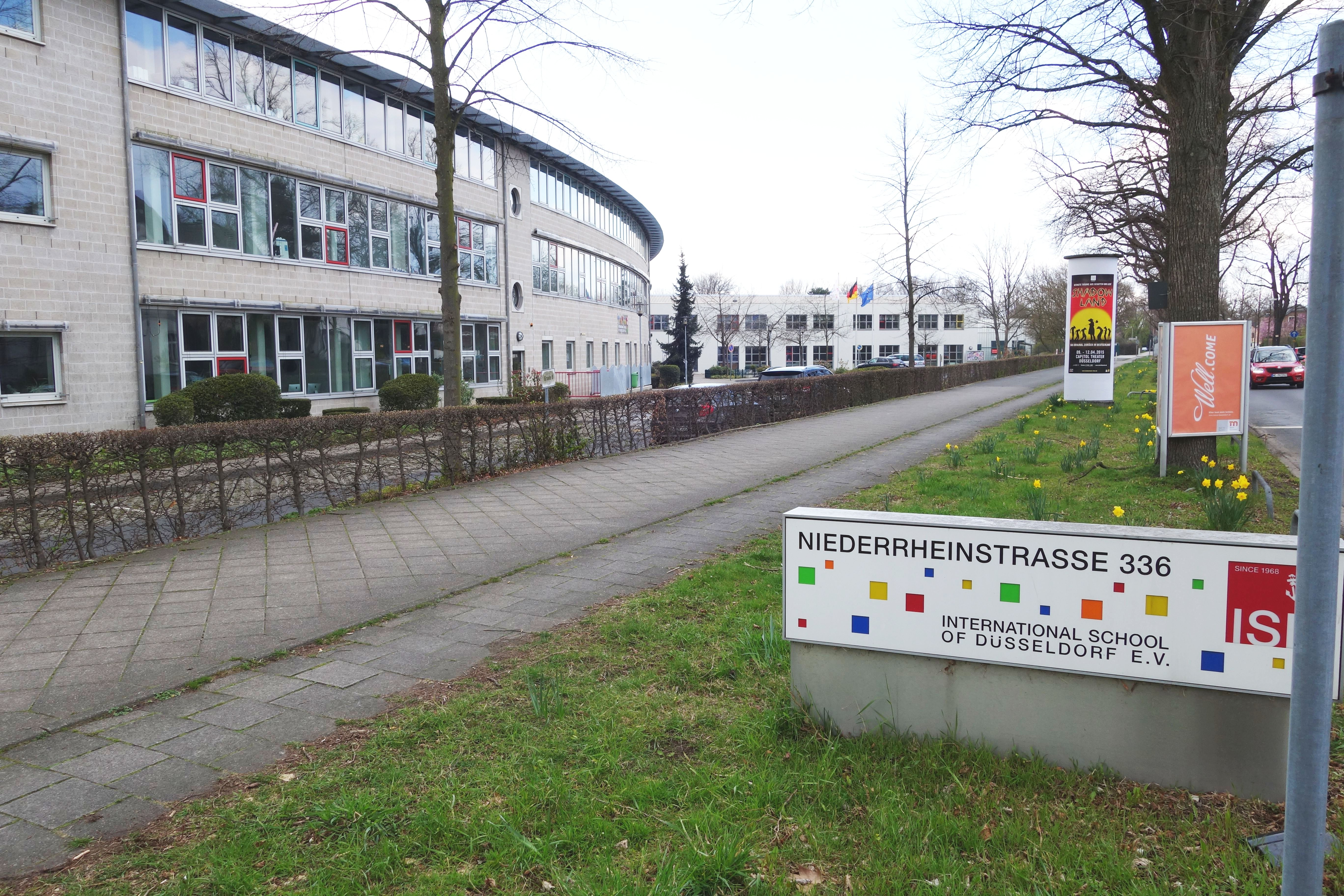
ISD Senior School

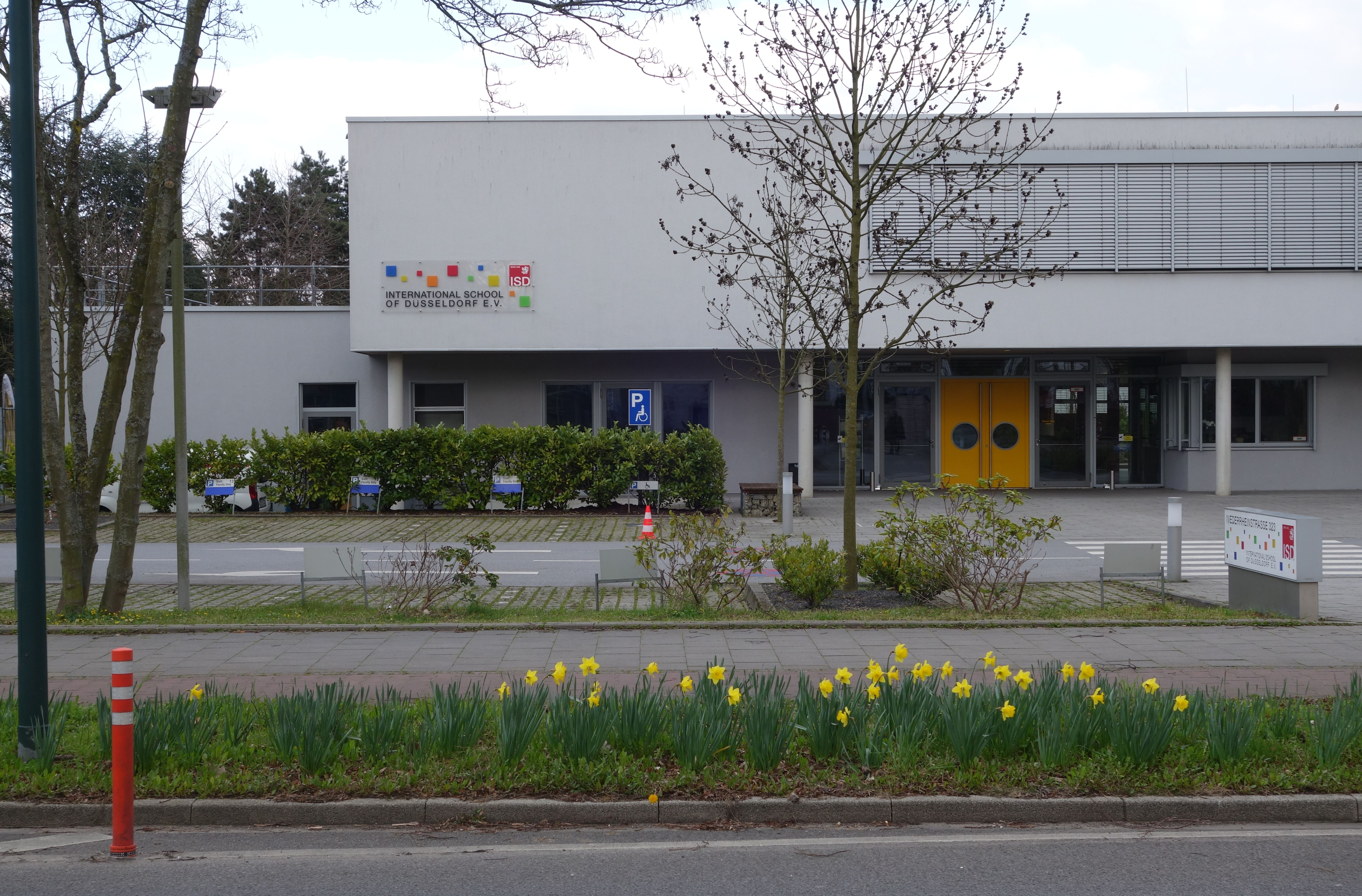
ISD Elementary School

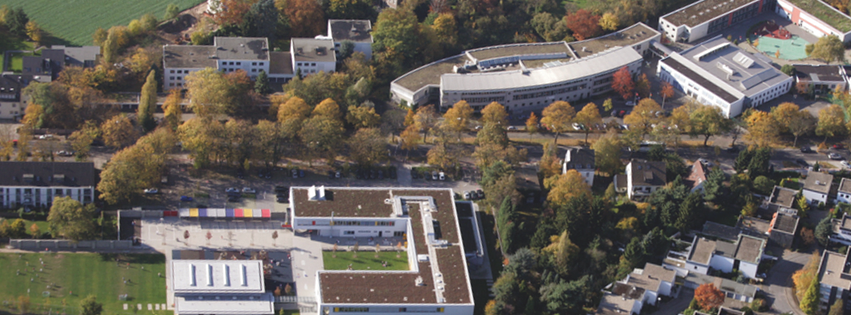

== History ==
(A)ISD began in 1968 as the American International School of Düsseldorf (AISD), an English language school to meet the needs of expatriate families. The founders, including Evelyn and Hank Zivetz, Ruby and David Prior, Polly and John Briwa, Alex McNaughton, and Dotty and Aaron Smith, were parents of the 32 original students, all in grades 9-12. The stated mission was to provide an American-style curriculum with emphasis on preparation for entrance into American colleges and universities. In, the second year (1969-1970), grades 4-8 were added, and in its third year (1970-1971) all grades were added to provide a continuous program from Kindergarten through 12th grade. The first graduating class (1969) consisted of 5 students.

AISD's first location was in several unused rooms on the top floor of the offices of the occupying British forces and the NAAFI (Navy, Army and Air Force Institutes) in Düsseldorf's Nordpark, in a building that no longer stands today In 1971, construction was completed on the new AISD campus, and the students and teachers relocated to its present location in Kaiserswerth, on the site where the school's North Building now exists.

During the first six years of the school's existence, the school became fully integrated into the Düsseldorf community. One of its largest contributions was the production of the annual musical, led by Dotty Smith, and performed by students from all of the grades. The musicals were performed to sold-out audiences over three nights each spring, and rehearsals were part of the after-school activities for most of the year. The productions were The Mikado (1969), The King and I (1970), Oklahoma (1971), Oliver (1972), Good News (1973), and The Sound of Music (1974).

In 1977, AISD became only the 65th school worldwide to offer the International Baccalaureate (IB) Diploma Program.

During the late 1970s and early 1980s, AISD took on more of the characteristics of an international school, including adding English as a Second Language support, and seeking international accreditations. In 1986, the school's name was changed to the International School of Düsseldorf.

In the 1990s ISD attained German Ersatzschule status, allowing the school to cooperate more closely with German educational experts on curricula, and paving the way for German students to transfer more easily between international and local educational systems.

In 2001, ISD applied to the International Baccalaureate Organization (IBO) for authorization to introduce the Primary Years Program (PYP) and Middle Years Program (MYP), to allow for one continuous strand of instruction from early childhood to graduation. In 2003, the process was completed, and the IBO authorized ISD as one of only 39 schools worldwide able to offer the entire IB program.

== School Divisions ==
=== ISD Elementary School ===
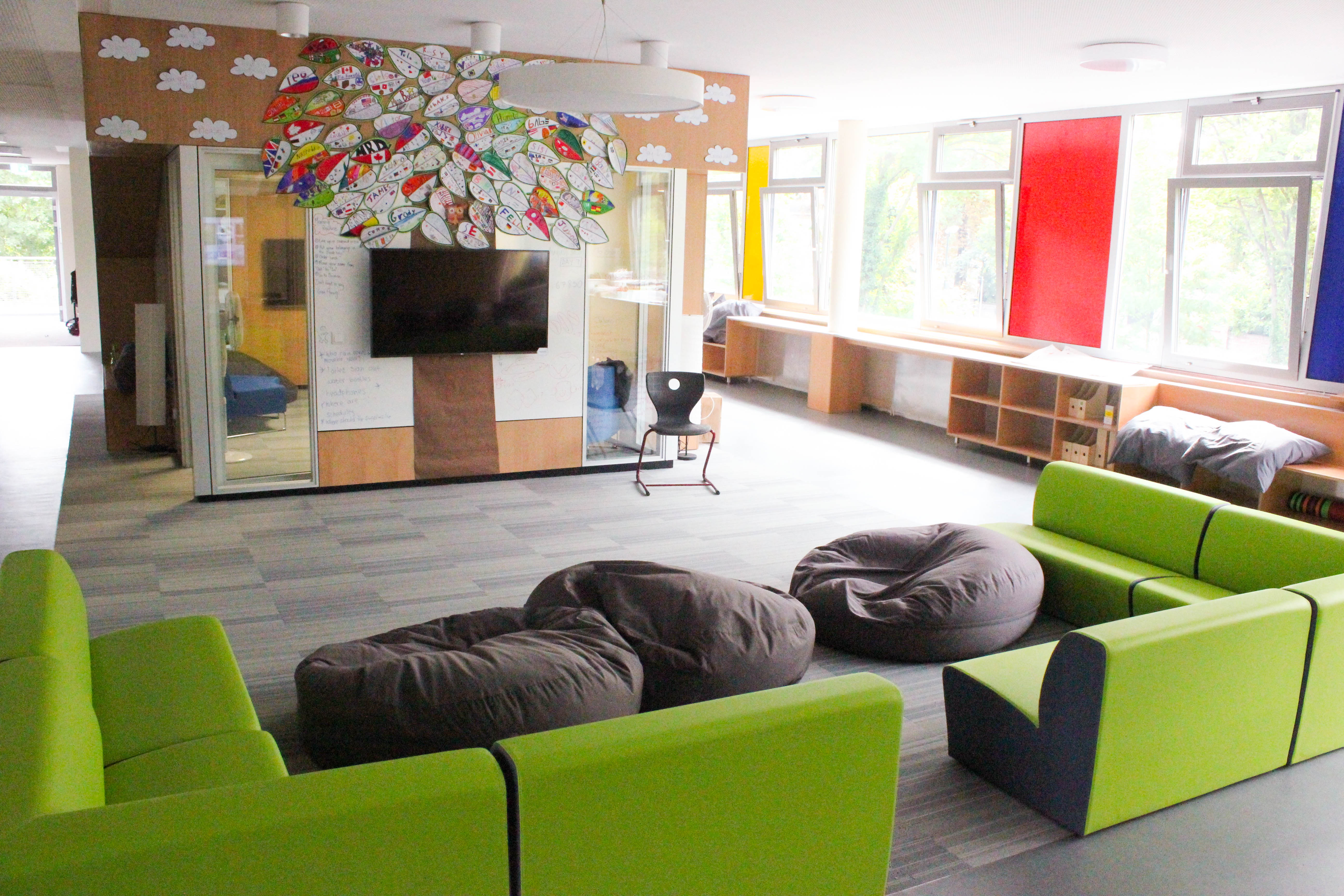
ISD Elementary Classroom

The elementary school of the International School of Düsseldorf is located on the west side of Niederrheinstrasse, and houses Kindergarten through Grade 5. The elementary school Principal is Heather Collins. The school uses the IB Primary Years Program (PYP) as a curriculum framework. ISD is inquiry-based, uses continuous assessment to determine next steps for learning, and encourages co-teaching and collaboration.

=== ISD Senior School ===
The senior school of the International School of Düsseldorf is located on the east side of Niederrheinstrasse, and houses Grades 6-12. The senior school Principal is Colin Campbell. The school offers the IB Middle Years Program (MYP) in grades 6-10, and the IB Diploma Program (DP) in grades 11–12.

The IB Diploma Program at ISD is inclusive, and all students are encouraged to undertake the full diploma. ISD offers 56 IB courses. The average IB scores at ISD are consistently above the world average. The 2017 ISD average was 34 points. Alternatively, students may choose to enroll in separate IB courses, resulting in receipt of individual subject certificates. All senior school courses contribute to earning the ISD High School Diploma.

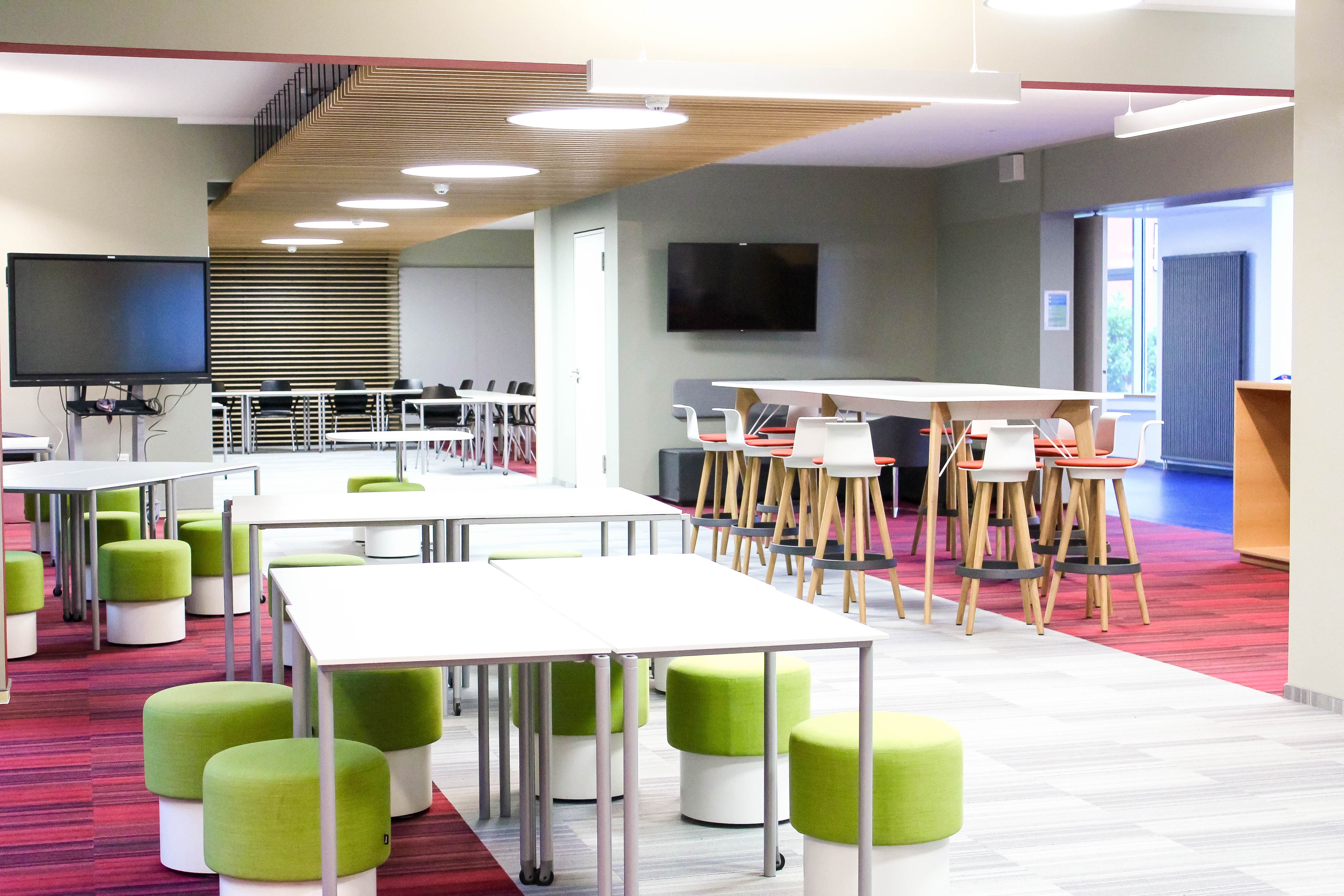
ISD Senior School

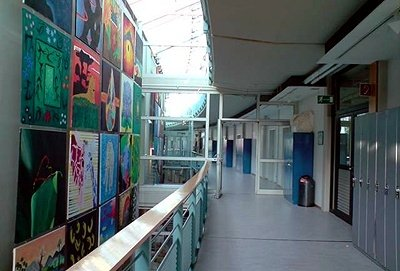
ISD South Building Corridor

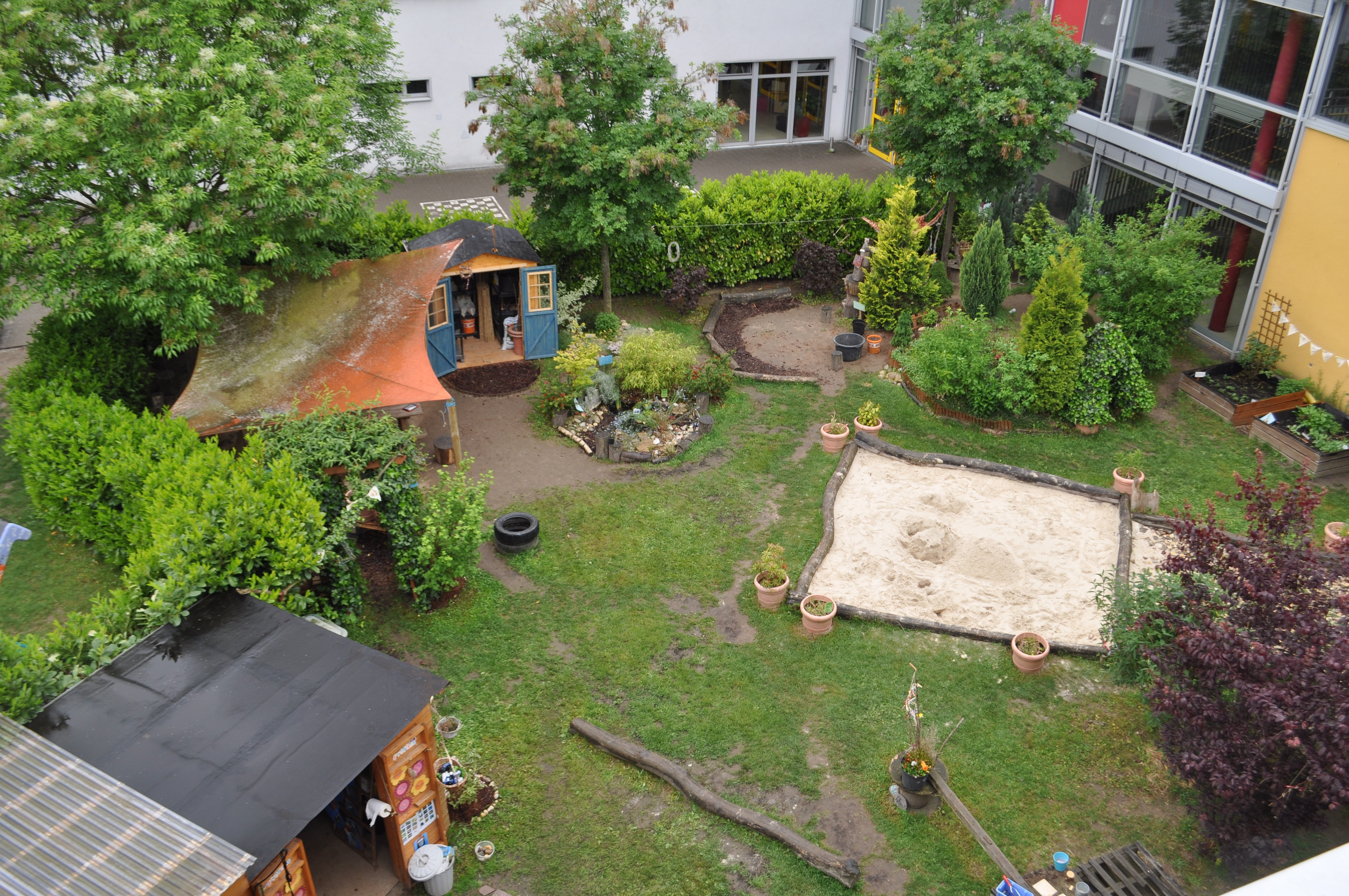
ISD Outdoor Learning Environment

The International School of Düsseldorf is a college preparatory school. 95% of ISD students pursue higher educations within one year of graduation. The remaining students typically pursue volunteer and/or internship opportunities or fulfill military/civil service obligations. The majority of ISD graduates go on to study in the US, UK, Netherlands, Germany, and Japan.

The ISD senior school counseling department has one college counselor for German universities, one for Japanese universities, and three for US, UK and global universities.

== Tanzanian Partner School ==
ISD has been involved in supporting a partner school in Tanzania for over 25 years. A team of ISD students and teachers visit the Moringe Sokoine Secondary School (MSSS) in Monduli, Tanzania every year. Students and teachers provide educational and financial support, and engage in a cultural exchange programme with the local school community in Monduli. The ISD community has provided hundreds of individual scholarships to MSSS students. Tanzanian author, Josephat Richard Mwambula, describes the sister school relationship in his book The Educated Tanzanian Youth Employment: Towards Improving Their Livelihoods.

== Controversy ==
=== Tuition fees ===
In late 2018, ISD was featured in an article by the tabloid Express regarding the school tuition as it relates to state subsidies. It was accused of having taken 4 million euros annually from the state of NRW while continuing to charge extremely high mandatory tuition fees, between 20,000-25,000 euros per year depending on the grade level. This was done by requiring parents to also sign up to an auxiliary "support association". The requirement of payment while still taking state funding was in violation of German law. At the time, it was reported that the school could have to repay up to 12 million euros. The situation was resolved by the end of 2019.

=== Firing ===
In 2018, the firing of a teacher on uncertain grounds also made news, and lead to legal action by the fired party. This struggle continued through to 2019.

=== Director's salary ===
Further criticism was attracted in 2019 when it was revealed that the then director of the school, Simon Head, earned 410 thousand euros annually, with additional extras for housing and travel. This was pointed out to have exceeded the salary of Germany's chancellor, Angela Merkel.

== Notable events ==
The International School of Düsseldorf has hosted:

- ECIS IT Conference (2007)
- AMIS (Association for Music in International Schools) European Middle School Honor Band Festival (March 2010 and March 2011)
- ISTA (International Schools Theatre Association) Festival (November 2017)
- Thriving in a New World - Speaker Series (2016-2017)
  - Ellen MacArthur Foundation - Engaging in and Designing the World of the Future
  - Alfie Kohn - Parenting in and Achievement Crazy Culture and Helping Kids to Challenge the Status Quo
  - Dr. Gary Stager - What Real Students Can Do Today to Help Us Envision What They Might Do Someday
  - Yong Zhao - World Class Learners: Educating Creative and Entrepreneurial Students
- TEDx IntlSchoolDüsseldorf - Produced by the ISD International Honor Society - Theme: Who Am I? (April 2017)
- Thriving in a New World - Speaker Series (2017-2018)
  - Will Richardson - Schools on the Brink: How Classrooms are Being Reimagined for a World of Networked Learning
  - Mark Prensky - Education to Better Their World: Unleashing the Power of 21st Century Kids
- Professional Learning Institute - Thriving in a New World (March 2018)
- Outdoor Learning Conference (May 2017 and May 2018)
- AMIS (Association for Music in International Schools) European Middle School Honor Girls' Choir (May 2018)
- ECIS Physical Education Conference (2018)

== Notable faculty ==
- Brian Mimmack, Co-Author "History Authoritarian and Single Party States" and "History: Paper One", IB History, Pearson Baccalaureate
- Finbar (Barry) O'Farrell, Author "IB Prepared: Approach your Assessment the IB way - Extended essay", International Baccalaureate Organization 2010

== Notable alumni ==
- Mari Kuraishi, Co-Founder and President of GlobalGiving
- Carey Mulligan, Actress
- Dominic Colenso, Actor, speaker
- Daman Tatic, Member from Serbia and Vice Chairperson of the UN Committee on the Rights of Persons with Disabilities
- Mari Terada, Pianist
- Hallie Polt, US Department of State, wife of former US Ambassador to Estonia, Serbia and Montenegro, Michael C. Polt

== Extracurricular activities ==
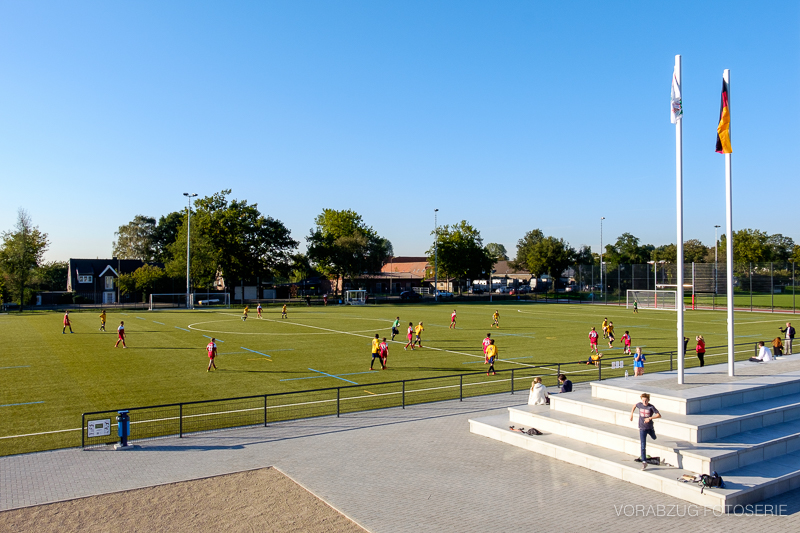
ISD Sporting Pitch

=== Competitive Sports ===
Athletes of ISD are called "Lions" or "ISD Lions".

ISD offers extensive sport facilities. In 2013, a new indoor Sports and Community Center (SCC) was built. The outdoor sports facilities, located 2 kilometers from the main campus, were renovated in 2016 and include an artificial turf field for soccer and rugby, 100 meter track field, basketball field, beach volleyball/soccer pit, a fitness complex and a spectator tribune.

=== Additional Activities ===
ISD offers After School Activities (ASA) for students from Reception (age 4) through Grade 12, as well as for parents and staff. Activities include art, ballet, badminton, chess, drama, fencing, golf, hip hop, languages, robotics, table tennis, and the Duke of Edinburgh Award

The ISD Model United Nations Team participates in The Hague Model United Nations (THIMUN) Conferences.

The ISD Speech and Debate Team participates in the New European Speech, Debate and Acting Association (NESDA)
