= Todd Whitaker =

American educator, writer and motivational speaker

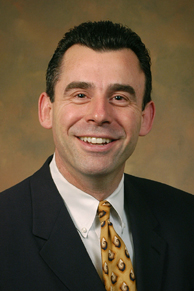
Todd Whitaker

Todd Whitaker is an American educator, writer, motivational speaker, educational consultant, and professor. A leading presenter in the field of education, Dr. Whitaker has published over 60 books on staff motivation, teacher leadership, technology, middle level practices, instructional improvement, and principal effectiveness, including the national best-seller, What Great Teachers Do Differently. Before leaving in 2016, he was a professor of educational leadership at Indiana State University. In 2013, Dr. Whitaker received the President's Medal from Indiana State University, the university's highest award for faculty.

== Education and early career ==
Todd Whitaker studied at the University of Missouri in Columbia, where he earned a B.S. in Business Administration in 1981. After graduating, Whitaker briefly attended law school before deciding to become a teacher. He subsequently returned to the University of Missouri and earned an M.Ed. in Education Administration in 1985 and a Ph.D. in Education Administration in 1992. He also holds an Ed.S. in Education Administration from Northwest Missouri State University.

Before embarking on a career in higher education, Whitaker was a math teacher and basketball coach in Missouri. He then went on to hold various positions as a principal at the middle school, junior high, and high school levels. Whitaker has also had experience as a middle school coordinator in charge of staffing, curriculum, and technology for the opening of new middle schools in Missouri.

== Writing and speaking career ==
Dr. Whitaker's books have sold millions of copies and been translated into many languages including German, French, Spanish, Korean, Japanese, Polish, Vietnamese and Chinese. What Great Teachers Do Differently, the national best-seller, has sold over 750,000 copies in the United States alone. The book focuses on the “beliefs, behaviors attitudes, and interactions of great teachers and explains what they do differently." Study guides, audio CD's, and DVD's have also been published to accompany the book. In 2013, What Great Teachers Do Differently was listed as one of the best-selling education books of the year by the New York Times.

Over the course of his career, Dr. Whitaker has been the recipient of numerous prestigious awards. In 2009, he was honored with the Indiana Association of School Principals President's Award, marking the first time that the award was granted to an individual in academia. In 2011, Dr. Whitaker won an Axiom Business Book Award for his book, The Ball. The Ball also earned Dr. Whitaker the 2011 USA Best Book Award for Business/Motivational writing. In 2012, he received the March On! award by Indiana State University for his generous contributions to the institution. Dr. Whitaker's 2011 publication Shifting the Monkey was a finalist for ForeWord Magazine's 2011 Book of the Year, a Category Winner for the 2012 Small Business Book Award, and a finalist for the 2012 USA Best Book Award.

Whitaker is also a member of the Education Speakers Group and the SDE (Staff Development for Educators). He regularly presents at conferences such as the National Association of Secondary School Principals (NASSP), the Association for Supervision and Curriculum Development (ASCD), the Academy of Management Learning and Education, and the National Association of Elementary School Principals (NAESP). Dr. Whitaker speaks on topics such as dealing with difficult teachers, building and enhancing staff morale, dealing with administrative change, classroom management, and proactive discipline.

In addition to his books, Whitaker has also published more than 30 articles and previously served as co-editor of Contemporary Education. He has reached millions of educators as a presenter, educational consultant, and keynote speaker.

Whitaker is a leader in the field of connecting educators through social media, and currently has 146.2K followers on Twitter.

== Books ==
- Your First Year: How to Survive and Thrive As A New Teacher (2016, Routledge, ISBN 978-1-138-12615-2)
- Dealing with Difficult Parents, Second Edition (2015, Routledge, ISBN 978-1-138-93867-0)
- A School Leader's Guide to Dealing with Difficult Parents (2015, Routledge, ISBN 978-1-138-96345-0)
- Study Guide to Dealing with Difficult Parents (2015, Routledge, ISBN 978-1-138-96346-7)
- What Connected Educators Do Differently (2015, Routledge, ISBN 978-1-138-83200-8)
- Quick Answers for Busy Teachers: Solutions to 60 Common Challenges (2014,Wiley, ISBN 978-1-118-92062-6)
- Dealing with Difficult Teachers, 3rd edition (2014, Routledge, ISBN 978-0-415-73346-5)
- Seven Simple Secrets: What the BEST Teachers Know and Do! (2014, Routledge, ISBN 978-1-138-01373-5)
- Study Guide, Seven Simple Secrets: What the BEST Teachers Know and Do!, 2nd edition (2015, Routledge, ISBN 978-1-138-78362-1)
- Seven Simple Secrets: What the BEST Teachers Know and Do! (2006, Routledge, ISBN 978-1-596-67021-1)
- Teach Smart: 11 Learner-Centered Strategies that Ensure Student Success (2013, Routledge, ISBN 978-1-59667-249-9)
- Teaching Matters: How to Keep Your Passion and Thrive in Today's Classroom, 2nd edition (2013, Routledge, ISBN 978-1-59667-240-6)
- The Secret Solution: How One Principal Discovered the Path to Success (2013, Rowman & Littlefield, ISBN 978-1-4758-0613-7)
- The Ten-Minute Inservice: 40 Quick Training Sessions that Build Teacher Effectiveness (2013, Wiley, ISBN 978-1-118-47043-5)
- Making Good Teaching Great: Everyday Strategies for Teaching with Impact (2012, Routledge, ISBN 978-1-59667-212-3)
- What Great Principals Do Differently: Eighteen Things That Matter Most, 2nd edition (2011, Routledge, ISBN 978-1-59667-200-0)
- Study Guide: What Great Principals Do Differently: Eighteen Things That Matter Most, 2nd edition (2011, Routledge, ISBN 978-1-59667-206-2)
- What Great Teachers Do Differently: 17 Things That Matter Most, 2nd edition (2011, Routledge, ISBN 978-1-59667-199-7)
- Study Guide: What Great Teachers Do Differently: 17 Things That Matter Most, 2nd edition (2011, Routledge, ISBN 978-1-59667-205-5)
- Shifting the Monkey: The Art of Protecting Good Liars, Criers, and Other Slackers (2011, Solution Tree, ISBN 978-1-936-76308-5)
- The Ball (2010, Solution Tree, ISBN 978-1-936-76307-8)
- What Great Coaches Do Differently: 11 Elements of Effective Coaching (2010, Routledge, ISBN 978-1-59667-150-8)
- Implementing School Change DVD and Facilitator's Guide: 9 Strategies to Bring Everyone on Board (2011, Routledge, ISBN 978-1-59667-175-1)
- 50 Ways To Improve Student Behavior: Simple Solutions to Complex Challenges (2009, Routledge, ISBN 978-1-59667-132-4)
- Study Guide, 50 Ways To Improve Student Behavior: Simple Solutions to Complex Challenges (2010, Routledge, ISBN 978-1-59667-139-3)
- Leading School Change: 9 Strategies To Bring Everybody On Board (2009, Routledge, ISBN 978-1-59667-131-7)
- Motivating & Inspiring Teachers: The Educational Leaders’ Guide For Building Staff Morale, 2nd edition (2008, Routledge, ISBN 978-1-59667-103-4)
- 4 CORE Factors For School Success (2008, Routledge, ISBN 978-1-59667-090-7)
- Study Guide: 7 Simple Secrets: What the Best Teachers Know and Do (2007, Routledge, ISBN 978-1-59667-066-2)
- What Great Teachers Do Differently: Facilitator's Guide (2007, Routledge, ISBN 978-1-59667-051-8)
- 6 Types of Teachers: Recruiting, Retaining, and Mentoring the Best (2004, Routledge, ISBN 978-1-930556-85-0)
- Great Quotes For Great Educators (2004, Routledge, ISBN 978-1-930556-82-9)
- Dealing With Difficult Teachers, 2nd edition (2002, Routledge, ISBN 978-1-930556-45-4)
- Feeling Great: The Educator's Guide To Eating Better, Exercising Smarter, and Feeling Your Best (2002, Routledge, ISBN 978-1-930556-38-6)
- Teaching Matters: Motivating & Inspiring Yourself (2002, Routledge, ISBN 978-1-930556-35-5)
- Dealing With Difficult Parents (And With Parents in Difficult Situations) (2001, Routledge, ISBN 978-1-930556-09-6)

== Articles ==
- Whitaker, T. (2013, August. "See Parents As Friends -- Not Foes" TES Connect, https://www.tes.co.uk/article.aspx?storyCode=6351231
- Whitaker, T. (2005, March). “ Predicting The Future of Education: So, When Are We Going Metric?” Principal Leadership, 3(7), p. 35-37.
- Whitaker, T. (2004, January/February). “Setting The Tone. “ Leadership. Association of California School Administrators, 33(4), p. 20-22.
- Whitaker, T. (2003, February). “Dealing With Difficult Teachers.” Audio Journal of Education (Reissue).
- Whitaker, T. (2003). “Power Plays Of Difficult Employees.” The School Administrator. American Association of School Administrators, 2(6), p. 12-16.
- Whitaker, T. (2003). “Dealing With Difficult Parents.” Principal Leadership. National Association of Secondary Schools, 2(60), p. 46-49.
- Whitaker, T. (2003, February). “Motivating Teachers: A Wire Side Chat With Todd Whitaker.” Education-World.com http://www.educationworld.com/a_admin/admin296.shtml.
- Gruenert, S. and Whitaker, T. (2003). “Why Do We Do What We Do?” Instructional Leader. Texas Elementary Principals and Supervisors Association, 16(1), p. 1-2, 12.
- Whitaker, T. (2002, November). “Dealing With Difficult Parents (And With Parents In Difficult Situations)”. Audio Journal of Education.
- Whitaker, T. (2002, September/October).” Addition By Subtraction: Eliminating Behaviors Of Ineffective Staff.” Perspective. American Association of School Personnel Administrators, p. 8-9.
- Whitaker, T. (2001). “Treating Everyone With Respect. It's Not The Best Thing, It's The Only Thing.” Hoosier Stars. Indiana Association of School Principals, p. 9-10.
- Whitaker, T. (2001, November). “Dealing With Difficult Parents (And With Parents In Difficult Situations).” Audio Journal of Education.
- Whitaker, T. (2001). “Treating Everyone With Respect. It's Not The Best Thing, It's The Only Thing.” Hoosier Stars. Indiana Association of School Principals, p. 9-10.
- Whitaker, T. (2001) “What Is Your Priority?” NASSP Bulletin. 84(617), p. 16-21.
- Whitaker, T. (2001, April). “Dealing With Difficult Teachers.” Audio Journal of Education.
- Whitaker, T. ((1999). “Utilizing 'Superstar' Teachers To Lead Change”. Catalyst For Change, 29(1), p. 5-8.
- Whitaker, T. (1999). “Staff Morale and Professional Development.” The Network News, 6(3), p. 1-2.
- Whitaker, T. (1999). “Seizing Power From Difficult Teachers.” The High School Magazine, 7(2), p. 36-39.
- Whitaker, T. (1999). “Examining The Impact Of The Indiana Principal Leadership Academy.” Special Edition 12(1), p. 1-2
- Whitaker, T. and Hays, C. (1998). “Parent/Student Computer Clubs: Teaming With Technology.” Schools In The Middle, 6(5), p. 15-16.
- Whitaker, T. (1997). “Three Differences Between 'More Effective' and ‘Less Effective' Middle Level Principals”. Current Issues In Middle Level Education, 6(2), p. 54-64.
- Whitaker, T. and Skow, L. (1997). “Understanding Today's Adolescent: The Path to Effective Communication.” Schools In The Middle, 7(2), p. 12-15.
- Conrad, M. and Whitaker, T. (1997). “Inclusion and The Law: A Principal's Proactive Approach.” Clearing House, 70(4), p. 207-210.
- Lumpa, D. and Whitaker, T. (1997). “Accessing External Funding -The Principal's Role.” Here's How, 15(4), p. 3.
- Whitaker, T. (1996). “Linking Technology and The Middle School.” Middle School Journal, 27(4), p. 8-14.
- Skow, L. and Whitaker, T. (1996). “It's What You Say And What You Do! Nonverbal Immediacy Behaviors: A Key To Effective Communication.” NASSP Bulletin, 80(584), 90-95.
- Whitaker, T. (1996). “Technology: Personalizing the Parent-Student-School Link.” Middle Ground, Winter, p. 6.
- Jordan, M., Whitaker, B., and Whitaker, T. (1996). “Parent-Teacher Conferences: Adding The Crucial Link: Student-Led Conferences.” KAMLE Karavan, 9, p. 21-22.
- Lumpa, D. and Whitaker, T. (1996). “Make Lunchtime a Picnic!” Principal, 76(2), 44-45.
- Whitaker, T. (1995). “Middle School Programs In Indiana.” In Focus. Fall, 19-20.

== Personal life ==
Whitaker is married to Beth, a professor of elementary education at Indiana State University and a former teacher and principal. They have three children.
