= Timothy Kanold =

American mathematician

Dr. Timothy D. Kanold is a mathematics educator and author of textbooks. He was the president of the National Council of Supervisors of Mathematics (NCSM) from 2008 to 2009.

Dr. Kanold holds a bachelor's degree in Education and a master's degree in Mathematics from Illinois State University, and a doctorate in Educational Leadership and Counseling Psychology from Loyola University Chicago. In 2007, he retired from his position as Superintendent at Adlai E. Stevenson High School in Lincolnshire, Illinois, where for 17 years, he served as Director of Mathematics and Science.

With Ron Larson, Dr. Kanold is co-author of 27 mathematics textbooks grades 6-12, written for Houghton Mifflin/McDougal Littell Publishing Company from 1988 to the present. Additionally, since 2001 he has authored and co-authored 18 books on K-12 mathematics and school leadership, published with Solution Tree Press. He continues to write and present for the National Council of Teachers of Mathematics on the Principles and Standards for School Mathematics, as well as for AASA and NASSP. He is the lead author for NCTM's update of the Teaching Performance Standards Document, and has presented more than 600 talks and seminars nationally and internationally over the past decade, with the primary focus on the creation of equitable learning experiences for all children in mathematics.

Dr. Kanold is the 1986 recipient of the Presidential Award for Excellence in Mathematics Teaching, the 1991 recipient of the Outstanding Young Alumni Award from Illinois State University, the 1994 recipient of the Outstanding School Administrator Award from the Illinois State Board of Education, and the 2001 recipient of the Outstanding Alumni Award from Addison Trail High School. He also is the developer and presenter for New Dimensions in Leadership: Leading in a Learning Organization, a training program for future school administrators. Considered to be a “Teacher of Leaders,” he currently provides training in mathematics program improvement, professional learning community development, and school leadership on behalf of Solution Tree. He also presents mathematics curriculum, instruction, and assessment workshops for NCTM and NCSM.

Dr. Kanold's daughter, Jessica McIntyre, taught mathematics at Aptakisic Junior High School, in Buffalo Grove, IL then served as the Principal from 2011–2016.
