= Solution Tree =

Educational publishing company

- Status: Active
- Founded: 1998
- Country of origin: United States
- Headquarters location: Bloomington, Indiana
- Distribution: Worldwide
- Key people: Jeffrey C. Jones, David Elmore, Ed Ackerman
- Publication types: Academic books, videos, online courses
- Nonfiction topics: Education, professional development, leadership
- Official website: www.solutiontree.com

Solution Tree is a professional development company and publisher of educational material for K–12 educators. Founded in 1998, the company provides services and products that include books, videos, conferences, workshops, consultation, and online courses. Solution Tree authors and consultants provide guidance to schools and districts on topics such as professional learning communities, response to intervention, educational assessment, and Common Core State Standards.

== Support of PLCs ==
Solution Tree provides training, consultation, and resources to help schools and districts implement the "PLC at Work" process. The process focuses on three concepts: ensuring that students learn, creating a culture of collaboration, and producing results. It was first introduced in 1998 with Professional Learning Communities at Work by Richard DuFour and Robert Eaker. The implementation handbook, Learning by Doing by Richard DuFour, Rebecca DuFour, Robert Eaker, and Thomas W. Many, was released in 2006 and provides strategies for building and sustaining PLCs.

Solution Tree also operates allthingsPLC.info, an online resource that provides helps educators in PLCs collaborate in an online global learning community. Through the website, schools and districts can apply to become model PLCs, which requires that applicants meet a set of criteria and reapply annually. Four times per year, Solution Tree publishes AllThingsPLC Magazine, which features information about PLCs and personal commentaries from educators.

== Collaborators ==
Solution Tree collaborates with experts in education topics, such as Richard DuFour (PLCs), Robert J. Marzano (evidence-based education), James Bellanca (deeper learning), Timothy Kanold (mathematics), Kurt W. Fischer (educational neuroscience), and Will Richardson (technology in education). The company often publishes and partners with professionals currently in the education industry to provide their expertise in education. This has raised questions in transparency in private earning by school officials. DuFour said that it represents a shift toward educational materials being written by educators.

== Professional development ==
Solution Tree provides various forms of professional development for educators. Working at the school or district level, Solution Tree offers short or long-term PD, from one-day events or workshops to in-depth, long term arrangements. In 2014, Solution Tree launched Global PD, an online tool designed to help schools and districts facilitate the work of PLCs.

== Acquisitions ==
In 2017, Solution Tree acquired Hawker Brownlow Professional Learning Solutions (HBPLS).
