= Cognitive Theory of Inquiry Teaching =

Learning theory

The Cognitive Theory of Inquiry Teaching, also referred to as the Cognitive Theory of Interactive Teaching, was developed by Allan Collins and Albert L. Stevens (Collins & Stevens, 1981). Allan Collins was a chief scientist at Bolt Beranek and Newman Inc., a research firm in Cambridge Massachusetts. He is also a specialist in the field of cognitive science and human semantic processing. Albert L. Stevens was a senior scientist at Bolt Beranek and Newman Inc. He was also director of the company's Artificial Intelligence, Education Technology and Training Systems Division. He is also a specialist in cognitive science. (Reigeluth, 1983) The Cognitive Theory of Inquiry Teaching according to Collins and Stevens (1981) requires the learner to construct theories and principles through dialogue, the teaching of self-questioning techniques and the teaching of metacognitive or self-monitoring skills, all with the intent of clarifying misconceptions so the theory or principle is well articulated and developed. The essence of the cognitive theory of Inquiry teaching is that of developing students' metacognitive skills. Inquiry teaching deliberately attempts to develop these stills through instruction.

The theory is a prescriptive model rooted in the discovery tradition and cognitive sciences. It was derived form an analysis of the transcripts of teachers, described as interactive teachers, using a variety of teaching strategies. These strategies were in some way related to one of the following methodology: the inquiry method of the teaching, discovery method of teaching and Socratic method of teaching. The transcripts studied represent a variety of topics taught by teachers across different subject areas (Reigeluth, 1983). Collins and Stevens believed that their Cognitive Theory of Inquiry Teaching is domain independent or that it can be applied across subject areas or the curriculum.

== Historical background ==
Inquiry teaching is rooted in the didactic methodologies of the ancient Greek. According Mayer and Alexander (2011), inquiry teaching is rooted in the didactic methodology of the ancient Greek, where the teacher poses a problem and assists the student in solving that problem by asking a series of question. They have also pointed out that this method of instruction can be seen in the works of Plato and Socrates. Bransford, Franks and Sherwood (1989), as cited by Mayer and Alexander (2011), have indicated that it was not until the 1960s that the role of teachers started to change from where the teacher provided the student with the questions as well as the answers. After the 1960s, instruction provided greater opportunity for students to engage in creating their own answers to questions posed (Mayer & Alexander, 2011).

== Characteristics ==
The purpose of the Cognitive Theory of Inquiry Teaching according to Collins (1986) is to provide learners with the opportunity to “actively engage in articulating theories and principles that are critical to deep understanding of a domain” (p.1). Collins (1986) believes that the knowledge attained will allow the learner to actively and meaningfully engage in solving problems and making predictions. He also indicated that the knowledge acquire is not simply content knowledge. Figure 1 summarizes Collins and Stevens Theory of Inquiry Teaching.

The Cognitive Theory of Inquiry (Interactive) Teaching according to the Reigeluth (1983) consists of three parts:

1. The teachers goals
2. The teaching strategies employed by teachers
3. The controlling structures used to govern their teaching.

There are two main goals teachers using the inquiry method seek to achieve, according to Collin and Stevens (1981):

1. The teaching of a particular rule or theory
2. Teaching students how to derive the rule or theory.

These two main goals are associated with several sub-goals. The list below identifies the two main goals and their associated sub-goal as posited by Collins and Stevens (1981):

1. The teaching of a particular rule or theory
  - Analyzing and addressing misconceptions of students hypotheses
  - Students are taught how to make prediction in new situations
2. Teaching students how to derive the rule or theory
  - Students are taught what questions to ask
  - Students are taught the nature of the theory or rule
  - Students are taught how to test the rule or theory
  - Student are taught how to articulate and defend the rule or theory

== Teaching strategies employed by teachers ==
Collins and Stevens (1981) have highlighted ten teaching strategies used by teachers using inquiry teaching. They believed that these ten teaching strategies, listed below, are the most important ones identified in their investigation. These ten teaching strategies identified by Collin and Stevens (1981, p. 18) are:

1. Selecting positive and negative exemplars
2. Varying cases systematically
3. Selecting counterexamples
4. Generating hypothetical cases
5. Forming hypotheses
6. Testing hypotheses
7. Considering alternative predictions
8. Entrapping students
9. Tracing consequences to a contradiction
10. Questioning authority

== Controlling structures used to govern their teaching ==
Colling and Stevens (1981) indicated that the time allocated between the teachers' goals and sub-goals is critical to the effectiveness of inquiry teaching. Collins and Stevens (1977), as cited by Collins and Stevens (1981) had made an attempt at developing a theory of controlling structures after getting feedback from several tutors. This controlling structure theory consisted of four parts. The four parts this theory includes the following:

1. "a set of strategies for selecting cases with respect to the main goals,
2. a student model,
3. an agenda,
4. a set of priority rules for adding goals and sub-goals to the agenda." (p. 47)

Collins and Stevens (1981) have suggested that base on the goals of the teacher, cases are selected to ensure that student develop mastery of the principles or theories being taught. They have also indicated that teachers appear to develop some strategies for selecting cases to develop students' mastery of the principles or theories. These are some of the strategies used by teachers for selecting cases as mentioned by Collins and Stevens (1981):

1. cases that demonstrated the more important factors were selected before those that have less important factors
2. the cases selected were sequenced from concrete factors to abstract factors
3. the selection of cases dependent on their importance and frequency: more important or frequent to less important and less frequent

According to Collins and Stevens the controlling structure used to govern the dialogue in the Cognitive Theory of Inquiry Teaching is demonstrated in the following manner:

1. A case is chosen, which is a theory or principle, based on the main goal of the teacher. The teacher then questions students to determine their understanding of the theory. Students' answers reveal their understanding or lack of understanding. Next, the teacher tags the theory or principle based what students know, their error and what they do not know. Collins and Stevens referred to this as the students' model.
2. Armed with the students' model, the teacher can then add information to facilitate and improve students understanding of what is known. This is determined by the level of sophistication of students' answers.
3. Sub-goals are developed to diagnose and address students' errors and misconceptions.
4. An agenda is developed prioritizing how students' errors and misconception well be address using the sub-goals developed.

Collins and Stevens (1977), as cited in Collins and Stevens (1981), have identified how priorities have been set by teachers. Priorities have been set based on the following:

1. "Errors before omissions.
2. Prior steps before later steps.
3. Shorter fixes before longer fixes.
4. More important factors before less important factors" (p. 49)

Criticism of the Cognitive Theory of Inquiry Teaching Reigeluth (1983) has put forward the following criticisms about Cognitive Theory of Inquiry:

1. He believes that the theory is not suitable for all kinds of content as proposed by Collins and Stevens (1981), who believed that the theory is domain independent and that it can be used to facilitate the development of rules and theories needed for deep understand of the domain. The theory, as he indicated, is more applicable to instruction involving the construction or understanding of rules, principles and theories. The theory may not be suitable for the teaching of facts or concept.
2. He believes that the theory is not self-sufficient, in that it requires the use of other forms of instruction to facilitate the development students background information, which is critical to the discovery process proposed by Collins and Stevens (1981)
3. The theory may not be efficient in specific rules and principle, particularly those involving algorithms, where an expository approach may be more efficient.

== Conclusion ==
The Collins and Stevens Cognitive Theory of Inquiry Teaching, despite the short coming identified by Reigeluth (1983), provides some strategies for teaching high-order thinking skills. Reigeluth (1983) also points out that the Collins and Stevens Cognitive Theory of Teaching provides some strategies for instruction that other theories have overlooked. Strategies such as considering alternative prediction, entrapping students, tracing consequences to a contradiction and questioning authority are invaluable skill in critical thinking. The focus of education today is to develop learners who are independent critical thinkers. There was once the belief that critical thinking skills could not be taught and that these skills develop naturally independent of instruction. The Collins and Stevens Cognitive Theory of Inquiry of Teaching indicate that learners can be taught strategies to develop and apply critical thinking skills. Dewey (1938), as cited by McGregor (2007), pointed out that if students are provided with factual information without the cognitive skills that would enable them to understand, appreciate, transfer and connect ideas, the information gained would become meaningless in the future. It implies therefore, that instruction should seek to nurture the development of critical thinking skill. Dewey (1910) as cited by McGregor (2007), has also indicated that there is a connection between thinking and learning. He posited that "thoughts involved in developing ideas and understandings are often assumed and implicated. To develop thoughtful learning these processes need to be more explicit and connected to the processes of coming to know and understand" (p. 47).

== Publications by Allan Collins and Albert L. Stevens ==
- Collins, A., & Stevens, A. L. (1981). A Cognitive Theory of Interactive Teaching. Cambridge: Bolt Beranek and Newman Inc.
- Collins, A. Processes in acquiring knowledge. In R.C. Anderson, R.J. Spiro, & W.E. Montague (Eds.), Schooling and the acquisition of knowledge. Hillsdale, N.J.: Erlbaum Associates, 1977.
- Collins, A. Explicating the tacit knowledge in teaching and learning. Paper presented at American Educational Research Association, Toronto, 1978.
- Collins, A., & Stevens, A.L. Goals and strategies of effective teachers. To appear in R. Glaser (Ed.), Advances in instructional psychology (Vol. 2). Hillsdale, N.J.: Erlbaum, 1981.

== See also ==
- Inquiry-based learning
- Discovering learning
- Problem-based learning
- Project-based learning
