= Ron Larson =

American mathematician (born 1941)

- Born: Roland Edwin Larson; October 31, 1941 (age 84); Fort Lewis, Washington, U.S.
- Citizenship: American
- Education: A.A., B.S., M.A., Ph.D.
- Alma mater: Clark College; Lewis & Clark College; University of Colorado
- Occupations: Professor, author, mathematician
- Spouse: Deanna Sue Gilbert (m. 1960)
- Children: 2
- Website: www.ronlarson.com

Roland "Ron" Edwin Larson (born October 31, 1941) is a professor of mathematics at Penn State Erie, The Behrend College, Pennsylvania. He is best known for being the author of a series of widely used mathematics textbooks ranging from middle school through the second year of college.

== Personal life ==
Ron Larson was born in Fort Lewis near Tacoma, Washington, the second of four children of Mederith (Note: Some sources give the spelling as "Meredith".) John Larson and Harriet Eleanor Larson. Mederith Larson was an officer in the 321st Engineer Battalion of the United States Army. Mederith Larson served in active duty during World War II, where he was awarded a Bronze Star Medal and a Purple Heart, and the Korean War, where he was awarded an Oak Leaf Cluster and a Silver Star. During the years that Ron was growing up, his father was stationed in several military bases, including Chitose, Hokkaido, Japan and Schofield Barracks, Hawaii. While in Chitose, Ron attended a small DoDDS school, where he was one of only three students in the sixth grade. When Mederith Larson retired from the Army in 1957, he moved with his family to Vancouver, Washington, where he lived until he died (at the age of 89) in 2005. Harriet Larson died (at the age of 95) in the fall of 2009.

Larson spent his first two years of high school at Leilehua High School in Wahiawa, Hawaii. In 1957, when his family moved to Vancouver, Washington, Larson enrolled in Battle Ground High School, where he graduated in 1959. On October 29, 1960, at the age of 18, he married Deanna Sue Gilbert, also of Vancouver, Washington. Deanna Gilbert was the second child of Herbert and Dorothy Gilbert. Ron and Deanna Larson have two children, Timothy Roland Larson and Jill Deanna Larson Im, five living grandchildren, and two great-grandchildren. Their first grandchild, Timothy Roland Larson II, died at birth on summer solstice, June 21, 1983.

Larson is the third generation of Norwegian and Swedish immigrants who left Scandinavia to homestead in Minnesota in the late 1800s. The surnames and immigration dates of his great-grandparents are Bangen (1866, Norway), Berg (1867, Norway), Larson (1868, Norway), and Watterburg (1879, Sweden).

Larson has contributed several thousand dollars to Republican politicians, including Rand Paul, Marco Rubio, Mitt Romney, and Scott Brown.

== Education ==
From 1959 until 1962, Ron and Deanna Larson started and operated a small business, called Larson's Custom Quilting. In 1962, they sold the business and Ron began attending Clark College in Vancouver, Washington. In 1964, he obtained his associate degree from Clark. Upon graduation from Clark College, Larson was awarded a scholarship from the Alcoa Foundation, which he used to attend Lewis & Clark College in Portland, Oregon. He graduated, with honors, from Lewis & Clark in 1966. During the four years from 1962 through 1966, Ron worked full-time, first at a restaurant and then at a grocery store, in Vancouver and Deanna worked full-time as the secretary to the president of Roberts Motor Company in Portland, Oregon.

From 1966 to 1970, Larson attended graduate school at the University of Colorado at Boulder. He received his master's degree in 1968 and his Ph.D. in mathematics in 1970. While at the University of Colorado, Larson was the recipient of an NDEA scholarship and an NSF fellowship. He also served as a teaching assistant. His Ph.D. dissertation "On the Lattice of Topologies" was written under Wolfgang J. Thron. Larson's Ph.D. lineage, as listed by the North Dakota State University, traces back through George David Birkhoff, Joseph Louis Lagrange, Leonhard Euler, and Gottfried Wilhelm Leibniz, the co-developer of calculus.

== Academic career ==
Larson and Hostetler signing first contract, 1976

In 1970, Larson accepted a position of assistant professor at Penn State Erie, The Behrend College in Erie, Pennsylvania. At the time, Behrend College was a 2-year branch campus of the university. In 1971, the Board of Trustees of the university met with the Behrend Advisory Board to announce Behrend College would become the first location outside University Park with the authority to develop baccalaureate program and confer degrees locally. During his first several years at the college, Larson was instrumental in developing a mathematics major at the college. He served as a member of the University Faculty Senate and also as Behrend College's representative on the University Faculty Council. Larson was promoted to associate professor in 1976 and professor in 1983.

Early in his career at Penn State, Larson started writing manuscripts for textbooks. He completed and submitted three manuscripts for calculus texts in 1973, 1974, and 1975, only to be rejected by several publishers. Larson relates his determination to continue writing in an essay titled A Single Dream. "When Marilyn Monroe was asked if she had been lucky in her career, she said 'When you have a single dream it is more than likely to come true---because you keep working toward it without getting mixed up.' Anyone who has been in my office knows that I am a Marilyn fan. But not just a Marilyn fan---I am a fan of the American Dream." Finally, in 1976 he and his co-author, Robert P. Hostetler, obtained a contract from D. C. Heath and Company. The first edition of their calculus book was published in December, 1978. In 1995, Hostetler left the authorship team and was replaced by Bruce A. Edwards of the University of Florida. Calculus by Larson and Edwards is now in its eleventh edition. It is used worldwide and has been translated in several languages.

During the academic year of 1983–84, Larson served as the acting division head for the Division of Science at Penn State Erie.

In 1998 Larson was given the Distinguished Alumnus Award from Lewis and Clark College, Portland, Oregon.

== Books ==
Counting different editions, Larson has written over 400 titles. They are used by several million students each year in the United States, as well as by students in other countries. Larson's books have received many awards – for pedagogy, innovation, and design. One of these awards was for developing the first completely interactive calculus textbook online. The work on this text was spearheaded by Larson's son, Timothy Larson. The online text, titled Interactive Calculus was posted in 1995. Another award was for innovation in page design. Beginning in 1990, Larson has written all of his mathematics texts to design, so that concepts and examples never break from page to page. The eighth edition of Calculus won the 2005 Benny Award for the best cover in all categories of printing. The middle school series, Big Ideas Math, won the TAA Textbook Excellence Award ("Texty") in 2010 for excellence in secondary mathematics textbook publishing. Larson's textbooks have won awards from the Textbook Authors' Association (TAA) multiple times, including the McGuffey Longevity Award, the TAA Textbook Excellence Award, and the Most Promising New Textbook Excellence Award.

Up until 1995, most of Larson's books were published by D. C. Heath, which was owned by Raytheon. In 1995, Raytheon sold D. C. Heath to Houghton Mifflin. By 1999, Larson's titles had become a major component of Houghton Mifflin's publications. In that year, he was listed in the company's annual report as one of Houghton Mifflin's major authors. In 2008, the College Division of Houghton Mifflin was sold to Cengage Learning.

Larson's textbooks have been translated into Spanish, Portuguese, Chinese, and French.

== Company founder ==
In 1984, Larson formed a small company that he called Larson Texts, starting with four employees in an old cottage on the campus of Behrend College. The cottage had been part of the original estate of Ernst Behrend, founder of Hammermill Paper Company.

In 1992, Larson Texts formed a software division called Meridian Creative Group, later renamed as Larson Learning. The division developed and sold tutorial mathematics software for grades K through 8. In 2005, Larson Learning was sold to Houghton Mifflin for $7 million.

1. Larson, Ron; Robyn Silbey (1998). "Larson's Middle School Math, Grades 6, 7, and 8". Larson Learning
2. Larson, Ron (2000). "Larson's Intermediate Math, Grades 3, 4, 5, and 6". Larson Learning
3. Larson, Ron (2002). "Larson's Elementary Math, Grades Kindergarten, 1, and 2". Larson Learning

== Research ==
During his first few years as an assistant professor at Penn State Erie, Larson continued to do research in the area of his dissertation. His research resulted in the publication of several articles, mostly dealing with the lattice of topologies. By the mid-1970s, however, he switched his writing efforts to textbooks.

1. Larson, R. E., R. P. Hostetler and B. A. Edwards (June 1994, July 1994). "CD-ROM Textbook and Calculus". FOCUS: Mathematics Association of America.

Until 2008, all of Larson's textbooks were published by D. C. Heath, McGraw Hill, Houghton Mifflin, Prentice Hall, and McDougal Littell. In 2008, Larson was unable to find a publisher for a new series for middle school to follow the 2006 "Focal Point" recommendations of the National Council of Teachers of Mathematics. He then started a new company to publish the books, Big Ideas Learning, LLC.

Larson (right) accepting Distinguished Alumnus Award, 1998

According to his acceptance speech for the Distinguished Alumnus Award in 1998, Ron's interest in writing mathematics textbooks started the summer after his sophomore year in college. "In my sophomore year I decided to switch to math. I wasn't prepared for it. I had forgotten my high school algebra and trig, and I had to spend my sophomore year taking those courses over again. After I was accepted to Lewis & Clark, I made an appointment to talk with the math department chair, Elvy Fredrickson. That was in June 1964. I asked Elvy if she would let me squeeze four years of math into my junior and senior years at Lewis & Clark. To imagine her thoughts, you have to remember that I had not even taken a course in freshman calculus. I didn't then know what Elvy was thinking. I only knew what she said and what she did. She went to a bookshelf in her office in the old math building, scanned the titles, took down a calculus text, handed it to me, and said, 'Study this book during the summer. The week before classes start in the fall, I will give you a test. If you pass, I will let you take your sophomore and junior mathematics courses concurrently. By the time you reach your senior year, you will be on track.' Years later, Elvy told me that she had no idea I would actually do it. But, I had no idea that she had no idea—and so I took her up on her offer. I read the calculus book, passed the test, and started taking third-semester calculus and linear algebra in the fall of 1964."

== Awards ==
1. Roland E. Larson, Text and Academic Authors Association McGuffey Longevity Award, 1996, Calculus, 7th Edition (Houghton Mifflin)
2. Roland E. Larson, Text and Academic Authors Association Textbook Excellence Award, 1996, Interactive Calculus: Early Transcendental Functions, (Houghton Mifflin)
3. Roland E. Larson, Text and Academic Authors Association Textbook Excellence Award, 1997, Interactive College Algebra, (Houghton Mifflin)
4. Roland E. Larson, Text and Academic Authors Association Textbook Excellence Award, 1997, Larson's Leapfrog Math, (Meridian Creative Group)
5. Ron Larson, Text and Academic Authors Association McGuffey Longevity Award, 1998, Larson's Leapfrog Math, (Meridian Creative Group)
6. Ron Larson, Lewis and Clark College Distinguished Alumnus Award, 1998
7. Ron Larson, Text and Academic Authors Association McGuffey Longevity Award, 2004, Calculus, 7th Edition, (Houghton Mifflin)
8. Ron Larson, Text and Academic Authors Association Textbook Excellence Award, 2004, Precalculus, 6th Edition, (Houghton Mifflin)
9. Ron Larson, Text and Academic Authors Association McGuffey Longevity Award, 2006, Calculus, 8th Edition, (Houghton Mifflin)
10. Ron Larson, Text and Academic Authors Association Textbook Excellence Award, 2010, Big Ideas Math, 1st Edition, (Big Ideas Learning)
11. Ron Larson, Text and Academic Authors Association McGuffey Longevity Award, 2011, Precalculus: Real Math, Real People, 6th Edition, (Cengage Learning)
12. Ron Larson, Text and Academic Authors Association McGuffey Longevity Award, 2012, Calculus: An Applied Approach, 9th Edition, (Cengage Learning)
13. Ron Larson, Text and Academic Authors Association Textbook Excellence Award, 2012, Big Ideas Math: A Common Core Curriculum, 1st Edition, (Big Ideas Learning)
14. Ron Larson, Text and Academic Authors Association Textbook Excellence Award, 2013, Calculus, 10th Edition, (Cengage Learning)
15. Ron Larson, Text and Academic Authors Association Most Promising New Textbook Award, 2013, Math & You: The Power & Use of Mathematics, 1st Edition, (Larson Texts)
16. Ron Larson, Text and Academic Authors Association Most Promising New Textbook Award, 2013, Big Ideas Math: A Common Core Curriculum Algebra 1, 1st Edition, (Big Ideas Learning)
17. Ron Larson, Text and Academic Authors Association Textbook Excellence Award, 2014, Precalculus, 9th Edition, (Cengage Learning)
18. Ron Larson, Text and Academic Authors Association Textbook Excellence Award, 2014, Big Ideas Math: A Common Core Curriculum, 7 Book Series, 2nd Edition, (Big Ideas Learning Learning)
19. Ron Larson, Text and Academic Authors Association McGuffey Longevity Award, 2014, Calculus: Early Transcendental Functions, 6th Edition, (Cengage Learning)

== Published books ==
1. Larson, Roland E.; Robert P. Hostetler (1979), Calculus with Analytic Geometry, D. C. Heath
2. Larson, Roland E.; Robert P. Hostetler (1982), Mathematics for Everyday Living, Saunders
3. Larson, Roland E.; Robert P. Hostetler (1983), Calculus An Applied Approach, D. C. Heath
4. Larson, Roland E.; Robert P. Hostetler (1985), College Algebra, D. C. Heath
5. Larson, Roland E.; Robert P. Hostetler (1985), Algebra and Trigonometry, D. C. Heath
6. Larson, Roland E.; Robert P. Hostetler (1985), Trigonometry, D. C. Heath
7. Larson, Roland E.; Robert P. Hostetler (1985), Precalculus, D. C. Heath
8. Larson, Roland E.; Bruce H. Edwards (1988), Elementary Linear Algebra, D. C. Heath
9. Larson, Roland E.; Bruce H. Edwards (1991), Finite Mathematics, D. C. Heath
10. Larson, Roland E.; Bruce H. Edwards (1991), Finite Mathematics with Calculus, D. C. Heath
11. Larson, Roland E.; Robert P. Hostetler (1992), Elementary Algebra, D. C. Heath
12. Larson, Roland E.; Robert P. Hostetler (1992), Intermediate Algebra, D. C. Heath
13. Larson, Roland E.; Robert P. Hostetler; Anne V. Munn (1992), College Algebra Concepts and Models, D. C. Heath
14. Larson, Roland E.; Robert P. Hostetler, Bruce H. Edwards (1993), College Algebra A Graphing Approach, D. C. Heath
15. Larson, Roland E.; Robert P. Hostetler, Bruce H. Edwards (1993), Algebra and Trigonometry A Graphing Approach, D. C. Heath
16. Larson, Roland E.; Robert P. Hostetler (1993), Precalculus A Graphing Approach, D. C. Heath
17. Larson, Roland E.; Timothy D. Kanold, Lee Stiff (1993), Algebra 1, D. C. Heath
18. Larson, Roland E.; Timothy D. Kanold, Lee Stiff (1993), Algebra 2, D. C. Heath
19. Larson, Roland E.; Laurie Boswell, Lee Stiff (1994), Geometry, D. C. Heath
20. Larson, Roland E.; Robert P. Hostetler, Carolyn F. Neptune (1994), Intermediate Algebra Graphs and Functions, D. C. Heath
21. Larson, Roland E.; Robert P. Hostetler, Carolyn F. Neptune (1994), Algebra for College Students: Graphs and Functions, D. C. Heath
22. Larson, Roland E.; Robert P. Hostetler, Bruce H. Edwards (1995), Precalculus with Limits: A Graphing Approach, D. C. Heath
23. Larson, Roland E.; Robert P. Hostetler, Bruce H. Edwards (1995), Calculus Early Transcendental Functions, D. C. Heath
24. Larson, Roland E.; Robert P. Hostetler, Bruce H. Edwards (1995), Trigonometry A Graphing Approach, D. C. Heath
25. Larson, Roland E.; Laurie Boswell, Timothy D. Kanold, Lee Stiff (1996), Passport to Algebra and Geometry, D. C. Heath, McDougal Littell
26. Larson, Roland E.; Laurie Boswell, Timothy D. Kanold, Lee Stiff (1996), Windows to Algebra and Geometry, D. C. Heath
27. Larson, Roland E.; Laurie Boswell, Lee Stiff (1997), Passport to Mathematics Book 1, D. C. Heath, McDougal Littell
28. Larson, Roland E.; Laurie Boswell, Lee Stiff (1997), Passport to Mathematics Book 2, D. C. Heath, McDougal Littell
29. Larson, Ron; Betsy Farber (2000), Elementary Statistics Picturing the World, Prentice Hall
30. Larson, Ron; Robert P. Hostetler, Bruce H. Edwards (2000), College Algebra: An Internet Approach, Houghton Mifflin
31. Larson, Ron; Robert P. Hostetler, Bruce H. Edwards (2000), Precalculus: An Internet Approach, Houghton Mifflin
32. Larson, Roland E.; Laurie Boswell, Timothy D. Kanold, Lee Stiff (2001), Mathematics Concepts and Skills Course 1, McDougal Littell
33. Larson, Roland E.; Laurie Boswell, Timothy D. Kanold, Lee Stiff (2001), Mathematics Concepts and Skills Course 2, McDougal Littell
34. Larson, Ron; Laurie Boswell, Timothy D. Kanold, Lee Stiff (2001), Algebra 1 Concepts and Skills, McDougal Littell
35. Larson, Ron; Robert P. Hostetler, Bruce H. Edwards (2002), Calculus 1 with Precalculus, Houghton Mifflin
36. Larson, Ron; Laurie Boswell, Lee Stiff (2003), Geometry Concepts and Skills, McDougal Littell
37. Larson, Ron; Laurie Boswell, Timothy Kanold, Lee Stiff (2004), Math Course 1, McDougal Littell
38. Larson, Ron; Laurie Boswell, Timothy Kanold, Lee Stiff (2004), Math Course 2, McDougal Littell
39. Larson, Ron; Laurie Boswell, Timothy Kanold, Lee Stiff (2004), Math Course 3, McDougal Littell
40. Larson, Ron; Laurie Boswell, Timothy Kanold, Lee Stiff (2005), Prealgebra, McDougal Littell
41. Larson, Ron; Robert P. Hostetler (2005), Algebra for College Students, Houghton Mifflin
42. Larson, Ron; Robert Hostetler, Anne V. Hodgkins (2006), College Algebra: A Concise Course, Houghton Mifflin
43. Larson, Ron; Robert Hostetler (2007), Precalculus: A Concise Course, Houghton Mifflin
44. Larson, Ron; Robert Hostetler, Bruce H. Edwards (2008), Essential Calculus: Early Transcendental Functions, Houghton Mifflin
45. Larson, Ron; Laurie Boswell, Timothy D. Kanold, Lee Stiff (2008), Algebra 2 Concepts and Skills, McDougal Littell
46. Larson, Ron (2009), Applied Calculus for the Life and Social Sciences, Houghton Mifflin
47. Larson, Ron (2009), Calculus An Applied Approach, Houghton Mifflin
48. Larson, Ron; Anne V. Hodgkins (2009) College Algebra with Applications for Business and the Life Sciences, Houghton Mifflin
49. Larson, Ron; Bruce H. Edwards (2010), Calculus, Cengage Learning
50. Larson, Ron (2010) Elementary Algebra, Cengage Learning
51. Larson, Ron (2010) Intermediate Algebra, Cengage Learning
52. Larson, Ron; Anne V. Hodgkins (2010), College Algebra and Calclulus: An Applied Approach, Cengage Learning
53. Larson, Ron; Laurie Boswell (2010), Big Ideas Math 1, Big Ideas Learning
54. Larson, Ron; Laurie Boswell (2010), Big Ideas Math 2, Big Ideas Learning
55. Larson, Ron; Laurie Boswell (2010), Big Ideas Math 3, Big Ideas Learning
56. Larson, Ron (2011), Precalculus, Cengage Learning
57. Larson, Ron (2011), Precalculus with Limits, Cengage Learning
58. Larson, Ron (2011), Precalculus: A Concise Course, Cengage Learning
59. Larson, Ron (2011), College Algebra, Cengage Learning
60. Larson, Ron (2011), Trigonometry, Cengage Learning
61. Larson, Ron (2011), Algebra and Trigonometry, Cengage Learning
62. Larson, Ron (2012), Algebra and Trigonometry: Real Mathematics, Real People, Cengage Learning
63. Larson, Ron (2012), Pecalculus: Real Mathematics, Real People, Cengage Learning
64. Larson, Ron (2012), College Algebra: Real Mathematics, Real People, Cengage Learning
65. Larson, Ron (2012), Precalculus with Limits: A Graphing Approach, Cengage Learning
66. Larson, Ron; Bruce Edwards (2012), Calculus 1 with Precalculus, Cengage Learning
67. Larson, Ron(2013), Calculus: An Applied Approach, Cengage Learning
68. Larson, Ron (2013), Brief Calculus: An Applied Approach, Cengage Learning
69. Larson, Ron; Anne Hodgkins (2013), College Algebra with Applications for Business and Life Sciences, Cengage Learning
70. Larson, Ron; Anne Hodgkins (2013), College Algebra and Calculus: An Applied Approach, Cengage Learning
71. Larson, Ron (2013), Elementary Linear Algebra, Cengage Learning
72. Larson, Ron (2013), Math & YOU: The Power & Use of Mathematics, andYOU.com
73. Larson, Ron; Bruce Edwards(2014), Calculus, Cengage Learning
74. Larson, Ron (2014), Precalculus, Cengage Learning
75. Larson, Ron (2014), Precalculus with Limits, Cengage Learning
76. Larson, Ron (2014), Precalculus: A Concise Course, Cengage Learning
77. Larson, Ron (2014), College Algebra, Cengage Learning
78. Larson, Ron (2014), Trigonometry, Cengage Learning
79. Larson, Ron (2014), Algebra and Trigonometry, Cengage Learning
80. Larson, Ron (2014), Elementary Algebra within Reach, Cengage Learning
81. Larson, Ron (2014), Intermediate Algebra within Reach, Cengage Learning
82. Larson, Ron (2014), Elementary and Intermediate Algebra within Reach, Cengage Learning
83. Larson, Ron (2014), College Prep Algebra, Cengage Learning
84. Larson, Ron; Laurie Boswell (2014), Big Ideas Math 1, Big Ideas Learning
85. Larson, Ron; Laurie Boswell (2014), Big Ideas Math 2, Big Ideas Learning
86. Larson, Ron; Laurie Boswell (2014), Big Ideas Math 3, Big Ideas Learning
87. Larson, Ron; Laurie Boswell (2014), Big Ideas Math Accelerated, Big Ideas Learning
88. Larson, Ron; Laurie Boswell (2014), Big Ideas Algebra 1, Big Ideas Learning
89. Larson, Ron; Laurie Boswell (2014), Big Ideas Advanced 1, Big Ideas Learning
90. Larson, Ron; Laurie Boswell (2014), Big Ideas Advanced 2, Big Ideas Learning
91. Larson, Ron; Bruce Edwards (2015), Calculus: Early Transcendental Functions, Cengage Learning
92. Larson, Ron; Besty Farber (2015), Elementary Statistics: Picturing the World, Pearson
93. Larson, Ron; Robyn Silbey (2015), Mathematical Practices: Mathematics for Teachers
94. Larson, Ron; Laurie Boswell (2015), Big Ideas Math Algebra 1, Big Ideas Learning
95. Larson, Ron; Laurie Boswell (2015), Big Ideas Math Geometry, Big Ideas Learning
96. Larson, Ron; Laurie Boswell (2015), Big Ideas Math Algebra 2, Big Ideas Learning

== Translations ==
1. Larson, Roland E.; Robert P. Hostetler, Bruce H. Edwards (1995), Cálculo y Geometria Analitica, Vol I, McGraw Hill, ISBN 84-481-1768-9 (Spanish)
2. Larson, Roland E.; Robert P. Hostetler, Bruce H. Edwards (1995), Cálculo y Geometria Analitica, Vol II, McGraw Hill, ISBN 84-481-1769-7 (Spanish)
3. Larson, Roland E.; Robert P. Hostetler, Bruce H. Edwards (1998), Cálculo com Applicações, LTC-Livros Técnicos e Ciêntificos, ISBN 85-216-1144-7 (Portuguese)
4. Larson, Ron; Robert P. Hostetler, Bruce H. Edwards (2002), Cálculo y Geometria Analitica, Vol I, McGraw Hill, ISBN 84-481-1768-9 (Spanish)
5. Larson, Ron; Robert P. Hostetler, Bruce H. Edwards (2002), Cálculo y Geometria Analitica, Vol II, McGraw Hill, ISBN 84-481-1769-7 (Spanish)
6. Larson, Ron; Robert P. Hostetler, Bruce H. Edwards (2002), Calculus 微积分, Houghton Mifflin, ISBN 957-29080-4-9 (Chinese)
7. Larson, Roland E; Bruce H. Edwards, David C. Falvo; (2004), Álgebra Lineal, Pirámide, ISBN 84-368-1878-4 (Spanish)
8. Larson, Ron; Betsy Farber (2004), Estatísticas Applicada, Prentice Hall, ISBN 85-87918-59-1 (Portuguese)
9. Larson, Ron; Robert P. Hostetler, Bruce H. Edwards (2005), Cálculo, Vol I, Pirámide, ISBN 84-368-1707-9 (Spanish)
10. Larson, Ron; Robert P. Hostetler, Bruce H. Edwards (2005), Cálculo, Vol II, Pirámide, ISBN 84-368-1756-7 (Spanish)
11. Larson, Ron; Bruce H. Edwards (2006), Calculus An Applied Approach 微积分一种应用的方法, Houghton Mifflin, ISBN 986-82003-1-8 (Chinese)
12. Larson, Ron; Bruce H. Edwards (2006), Brief Calculus An Applied Approach 微积分一种应用的方法, Houghton Mifflin, ISBN 986-82003-2-6 (Chinese)
13. Larson, Ron; Robert P. Hostetler, Bruce H. Edwards (2006), Calculus 微积分, Houghton Mifflin, ISBN 986-82003-3-4 (Chinese)
14. Larson, Roland E.; Robert P. Hostetler (2008), Precalculo, Reverte, ISBN 84-291-5168-0 (Spanish)
15. Larson, Ron; Bruce H. Edwards (2009), Matematicas I Cálculo Differencial, McGraw Hill, ISBN 970-10-7289-8 (Spanish)
16. Larson, Ron; Bruce H. Edwards (2009), Matematicas II Cálculo Integral, McGraw Hill, ISBN 970-10-7290-1 (Spanish)
17. Larson, Ron; Bruce H. Edwards (2009), Matematicas III Cálculo de Varias Variables, McGraw Hill, ISBN 970-10-7291-X (Spanish)

== Sources ==
- (November 7, 1976, Page 18-A). "2 Behrend Professors Author Text on Calculus". Erie Times News
- (March 1, 1981). "Book on Handling Money Penned by Behrend Profs". Erie Times News
- Craig, Cindy (February 1, 1982, Volume 37, Number 9, Page 7). "Behrend Profs Achieve Publishing Success". The Collegian, Penn State Erie's Weekly Newspaper
- Dile, Robin (May 20, 1984). "Professor Invents the 'Perfect' Dice". Erie Times News
- Ross, Michael (March 1, 1985, Volume 33, Number 10, Page 1). "Larson and Hostetler Offer Precalculus Series". The Collegian, Penn State Erie's Weekly Newspaper
- Center Spread (March, 1985, Volume 6, Number 1, Page 17). "Dice Game". Physical Science and Engineering, Research Penn State.
- Howard, Pat (July 25, 1985, Page 1B). "Textbook Authors Still Get Thrill of Writing". Erie Daily Times
- (March 22, 1985). "Penn State Behrend Honors Faculty Authors at Book Day". Erie Times News
- (December 13, 1987). "Behrend Honors Philanthropists". Erie Times News
- Pellegrini, Mike (August 5, 1991, Page 5). "He Writes Best Sellers for Math Students". Pittsburgh Post Gazette
- (Fall, 1991, pages 4–5). "Read Any Good Math Books Lately?". The Behrend Quarterly
- (August 15, 1995, Page 12C). "Interactive Computer Companion Developed for Behrend Prof's Text". Erie Times News
- (August 20, 1995). "Behrend Professor Offers High Tech Instruction in Math". Erie Times-News
- Pawlak, Kim (Notable Author Series, 1997). "Ron Larson: Author and Publisher", Text and Academic Authors, Online Information for TAA Members
- Pawlak, Kim (Notable Author Series, 1997). "Instilling a Love for Math", Text and Academic Authors, Online Information for TAA Members
- Pawlak, Kim (Notable Author Series, 1997). "Obsessed with Writing", Text and Academic Authors, Online Information for TAA Members
- Alumni News (Fall, 1998, Volume 8, Number 1, Page 8). "Three Outstanding Alumni Honored". The Lewis & Clark Chronicle
- (April 23, 1998, Page 12C). "Profile Ron Larson, Meridian Creative Group". Morning News, Erie
- McQuaid, Deborah (February 10, 1999). "Firm May Move into Former School". Erie Times-News
- New Ways to Know (1999), Houghton Mifflin Annual Report
- Martin, Jim (March 9, 2003). "At Larson Texts, Success is Academic". Erie Times News
- Savory, Jon (November 26, 2003, Part 1). "Numbing the Mind with Numbers: Inside the Head of Mathematics Author Ron Larson". County College of Morris Student Newspaper, The Youngstown Edition
- Savory, Jon (December 10, 2003, Part 1). "Does Two Plus Two Really Equal Four". County College of Morris Student Newspaper, The Youngstown Edition
- Editorial Review
- Cengage Learning Biography of Ron Larson
