= Big Ideas Learning =

Big Ideas Learning, LLC
- Founded: 2008
- Founder: Ron Larson
- Country of origin: United states
- Headquarters location: Erie, Pennsylvania
- Distribution: National Geographic Learning
- Key people: Matthew Totzke, CEO
- Nonfiction topics: Mathematics textbooks
- No. of employees: 160
- Official website: www.BigIdeasLearning.com

Big Ideas Learning, LLC is an educational publisher in the United States. The company's headquarters is located in Erie, Pennsylvania. It publishes mathematics textbooks and instructional technology materials.

Big Ideas Learning is a privately owned Limited liability company.

== History ==
The origins of Big Ideas Learning go back to 1980, when mathematics textbook author Ron Larson started a small company called Larson Texts. The company became incorporated in Pennsylvania in 1992 and became Larson Texts, Inc.

In 2008, the owners of Larson Texts formed a separate publishing company called Big Ideas Learning. Big Ideas Learning develops and publishes mathematics textbooks. The name of the company is related to the 2006 "Focal Point" recommendations of the National Council of Teachers of Mathematics. In September 2006, NCTM released Curriculum Focal Points for Prekindergarten through Grade 8 Mathematics: A Quest for Coherence. In the Focal Points, NCTM identifies what it believes to be the most important mathematical topics ("the big ideas") for each grade level, including the related ideas, concepts, skills, and procedures that form the foundation for understanding and lasting learning.

In 2017 Big Ideas Learning announced a new partnership with National Geographic Learning (NGL), a Cengage company. National Geographic Learning is the sole distributor of the Big Ideas Math programs.

== Publications ==
The first publication for Big Ideas Learning was a series of middle school mathematics textbooks that implemented the NCTM's focal point curriculum. Each book had a national edition and a Florida edition, which was submitted for adoption in the state of Florida. In the spring of 2010, Big Ideas Math was adopted by over half of Florida's 67 counties. The series won the 2010 Textbook Excellence Award ("Texty") for excellence in textbook publishing in the Elementary-High School Division for Mathematics.

In 2010, Big Ideas Learning published a series of middle school mathematics textbooks that implemented the Virginia Standards of Learning. In 2011, Big Ideas Learning published a series of middle school mathematics textbooks that implemented the Common Core State Standards. The series won the 2012 Textbook Excellence Award ("Texty") for excellence in textbook publishing in the Elementary-High School Division for Mathematics. In 2013, Big Ideas Math: A Common Core Curriculum Algebra 1 received the award for Most Promising Textbook from the Text and Academic Authors Association.

In 2014, Big Ideas Learning debuted the Big Ideas Math Algebra 1, Geometry, and Algebra 2 Common Core high school mathematics curriculum. The company also announced that it will be releasing the Big Ideas Math Course 1, Course 2, and Course 3 Common Core integrated high school mathematics curriculum in the spring of 2015.

1. Larson, Ron; Laurie Boswell (2010), Big Ideas Math Green, Big Ideas Learning
2. Larson, Ron; Laurie Boswell (2010), Big Ideas Math Red, Big Ideas Learning
3. Larson, Ron; Laurie Boswell (2010), Big Ideas Math Blue, Big Ideas Learning
4. Larson, Ron; Laurie Boswell (2010), Big Ideas Math 6 Florida Edition, Big Ideas Learning
5. Larson, Ron; Laurie Boswell (2010), Big Ideas Math 7 Florida Edition , Big Ideas Learning
6. Larson, Ron; Laurie Boswell (2010), Big Ideas Math 8 Florida Edition , Big Ideas Learning
7. Larson, Ron; Laurie Boswell (2012), Big Ideas Math 6 Virginia Edition, Big Ideas Learning
8. Larson, Ron; Laurie Boswell (2012), Big Ideas Math 7 Virginia Edition, Big Ideas Learning
9. Larson, Ron; Laurie Boswell (2012), Big Ideas Math 8 Virginia Edition, Big Ideas Learning
10. Larson, Ron; Laurie Boswell (2012), Big Ideas Math A Common Core Curriculum Green, Big Ideas Learning
11. Larson, Ron; Laurie Boswell (2012), Big Ideas Math A Common Core Curriculum Red, Big Ideas Learning
12. Larson, Ron; Laurie Boswell (2012), Big Ideas Math A Common Core Curriculum Blue, Big Ideas Learning
13. Larson, Ron; Laurie Boswell (2013), Big Ideas Math A Common Core Curriculum Red Accelerated, Big Ideas Learning
14. Larson, Ron; Laurie Boswell (2013), Big Ideas Math A Common Core Curriculum Algebra 1, Big Ideas Learning
15. Larson, Ron; Laurie Boswell (2014), Big Ideas Math 6 Georgia Edition, Big Ideas Learning
16. Larson, Ron; Laurie Boswell (2014), Big Ideas Math 7 Georgia Edition, Big Ideas Learning
17. Larson, Ron; Laurie Boswell (2014), Big Ideas Math 8 Georgia Edition, Big Ideas Learning
18. Larson, Ron; Laurie Boswell (2014), Big Ideas Math 7 Accelerated Georgia Edition, Big Ideas Learning
19. Larson, Ron; Laurie Boswell (2014), Big Ideas Math A Common Core Curriculum Green, Big Ideas Learning
20. Larson, Ron; Laurie Boswell (2014), Big Ideas Math A Common Core Curriculum Red, Big Ideas Learning
21. Larson, Ron; Laurie Boswell (2014), Big Ideas Math A Common Core Curriculum Blue, Big Ideas Learning
22. Larson, Ron; Laurie Boswell (2014), Big Ideas Math A Common Core Curriculum Algebra 1, Big Ideas Learning
23. Larson, Ron; Laurie Boswell (2014), Big Ideas Math A Common Core Curriculum Red Accelerated, Big Ideas Learning
24. Larson, Ron; Laurie Boswell (2014), Big Ideas Math A Common Core Curriculum Advanced 1, Big Ideas Learning
25. Larson, Ron; Laurie Boswell (2014), Big Ideas Math A Common Core Curriculum Advanced 2, Big Ideas Learning
26. Larson, Ron; Laurie Boswell (2015), Big Ideas Math Course 1 A Common Core Curriculum California Edition, Big Ideas Learning
27. Larson, Ron; Laurie Boswell (2015), Big Ideas Math Course 2 A Common Core Curriculum California Edition, Big Ideas Learning
28. Larson, Ron; Laurie Boswell (2015), Big Ideas Math Course 3 A Common Core Curriculum California Edition, Big Ideas Learning
29. Larson, Ron; Laurie Boswell (2015), Big Ideas Math Algebra 1 A Common Core Curriculum California Edition, Big Ideas Learning
30. Larson, Ron; Laurie Boswell (2015), Big Ideas Math Course 2 Accelerated A Common Core Curriculum California Edition, Big Ideas Learning
31. Larson, Ron; Laurie Boswell (2015), Big Ideas Math Advanced 1 A Common Core Curriculum California Edition, Big Ideas Learning
32. Larson, Ron; Laurie Boswell (2015), Big Ideas Math Advanced 2 A Common Core Curriculum California Edition, Big Ideas Learning
33. Larson, Ron; Laurie Boswell (2015), Big Ideas Math Course 1 A Common Core Curriculum Florida Edition, Big Ideas Learning
34. Larson, Ron; Laurie Boswell (2015), Big Ideas Math Course 2 A Common Core Curriculum Florida Edition, Big Ideas Learning
35. Larson, Ron; Laurie Boswell (2015), Big Ideas Math Prealgebra A Common Core Curriculum Florida Edition, Big Ideas Learning
36. Larson, Ron; Laurie Boswell (2015), Big Ideas Math Algebra 1 A Common Core Curriculum Florida Edition, Big Ideas Learning
37. Larson, Ron; Laurie Boswell (2015), Big Ideas Math Advanced 1 A Common Core Curriculum Florida Edition, Big Ideas Learning
38. Larson, Ron; Laurie Boswell (2015), Big Ideas Math Advanced 2 A Common Core Curriculum Florida Edition, Big Ideas Learning
39. Larson, Ron; Laurie Boswell (2015), Big Ideas Math Algebra 1: A Common Core Curriculum, Big Ideas Learning
40. Larson, Ron; Laurie Boswell (2015), Big Ideas Math Geometry: A Common Core Curriculum , Big Ideas Learning
41. Larson, Ron; Laurie Boswell (2015), Big Ideas Math Algebra 2: A Common Core Curriculum , Big Ideas Learning
42. Larson, Ron; Laurie Boswell (2015), Big Ideas Math Algebra 1 Texas Edition, Big Ideas Learning
43. Larson, Ron; Laurie Boswell (2015), Big Ideas Math Geometry Texas Edition , Big Ideas Learning
44. Larson, Ron; Laurie Boswell (2015), Big Ideas Math Algebra 2 Texas Edition, Big Ideas Learning

== Awards ==
1. Ron Larson, Text and Academic Authors Association Textbook Excellence Award, 2010, Big Ideas Math, 1st Edition, (Big Ideas Learning)
2. Ron Larson, Text and Academic Authors Association Textbook Excellence Award, 2012, Big Ideas Math: A Common Core Curriculum, 1st Edition, (Big Ideas Learning)
3. Ron Larson, Text and Academic Authors Association Most Promising New Textbook Award, 2013, Big Ideas Math: A Common Core Curriculum Algebra 1, 1st Edition (Big Ideas Learning)
4. Ron Larson, Text and Academic Authors Association Textbook Excellence Award, 2014, Big Ideas Math: A Common Core Curriculum, 7 Book Series, 2nd Edition, (Big Ideas Learning Learning)

== Sources ==
- Ed-Pub Ohio "Ron Larson Introduces New Focal Points Curriculum"
- Florida Association of School Administrators
- Math and Literacy Intervention
- CAMT Online
- Ten County Mathematics Education Association
- Florida Department of State
- Utah State Office of Education
- Orlando Sentinel
- Florida Association of District Instructional Materials Administrators
- Florida Diagnostic and Learning Resources System
- The Steve Colgan Gallery
- 2009-2010 Florida Short Bid Report
- Virginia Approved K-12 Mathematics Textbooks
- Alabama Recommendations for Adoption Mathematics 2011
