= Practice-based professional learning =

Learning theory

Practice-based professional learning (PBPL) is understood in contrast to classroom- or theory-based learning. It is kindred to terms such as work-based learning, workplace or work-centred learning. Distinctive, though, are a concern for professional learning, and the preference for practice rather than work. While it does not disdain propositional knowledge and what is sometimes called theory, its prime interest is in the formation of self-renewing and effective professional practices—a distinct theoretical position in its own right.

== UK Higher Education ==
The range of concerns may be seen, for example, in the UK Open University's practice-based professional learning centre, one of the Higher Education Funding Council for England's centres for excellence in teaching and learning. Its interests cover the inter-relation of various forms of professional knowledge, ways of fostering them and their co-ordination, workplaces as sites of learning, the assessment of practice-based learning achievements, and the use of modern technologies to support distributed learning.

Other centres for excellence occupy some or all of the territory, notably the Professional Development Unit at the University of Chester, SCEPTrE in the University of Surrey, CEPLW in the University of Westminster and NCWBLP in Middlesex University.

Interest in this territory is not confined to the UK, with some of the most respected work associated with David Boud at the University of Technology, Sydney, NSW.

== US K-12 Education ==
As practiced in K-12 education in the United States, practice-based professional learning develops and integrates a school's use of curriculum and assessment, instructional leadership, and professional learning communities (PLCs) to create a system-wide shift in day-to-day classroom instruction. Indeed, it is this focus on daily classroom practice, "the core tasks and activities of teaching rather than knowledge or theory" that distinguishes practice-based professional learning from other models of professional learning and development. Several US universities and educational companies have created materials and resources that use a PBPL approach.

== See also ==
- Professional learning community
- Reflective practice
- Work-based learning
