= Association for Music in International Schools =

School music organization

- Abbreviation: AMIS
- Formation: 1975
- Founder: Georgia and Richard Bassett
- Type: Non-profit Charity
- Headquarters: London, United Kingdom
- Official language: English
- Executive Director: Megan Highfill
- Chief Operating Officer: Tim Germann
- Assistant Director: Trestan Peck
- Website: www.amis-online.org

The Association for Music in International Schools is a global non-profit charity, based in the United Kingdom, that hosts festivals, workshops, professional development, and other events globally for international school music students and educators.

The association's acronym AMIS is also the French word amis, which means friends, and is pronounced as such.

== Member schools ==
AMIS' member schools are in five continents: Asia, Africa, Europe, South America, and North America.
