= NASSP Bulletin =

- Discipline: Education
- Language: English
- Edited by: Pamela Salazar

Publication details
- History: 1917-present
- Publisher: SAGE Publications
- Frequency: Quarterly

Standard abbreviations
- ISO 4: NASSP Bull.

Indexing
- ISSN: 0192-6365
- LCCN: 80643548
- OCLC no.: 4248543

Links
- Journal homepage; Online access

NASSP Bulletin is a quarterly peer-reviewed academic journal that covers the field of education administration. The editor-in-chief is Pamela Salazar (University of Nevada). It was established in 1917 and is currently published by SAGE Publications in association with the National Association of Secondary School Principals.

== Abstracting and indexing ==
NASSP Bulletin is abstracted and indexed in:

- ERIC
- NISC
- ProQuest
- SafetyLit
- Scopus
- Wilson Education Index/Abstracts
