= Richard DuFour =

American educational researcher (1947–2017)

Dr. Richard DuFour
- Born: September 23, 1947
- Died: February 8, 2017 (aged 69); Forest, Virginia
- Known for: Educational research; School administration
- Spouse: Rebecca DuFour

Richard DuFour (September 23, 1947 – February 8, 2017) was an American educational researcher noted for developing strategies to create collaborative teaching environments in K–12 schools.

== Career ==
DuFour was principal of Stevenson High School in Lincolnshire, Illinois, from 1983 to 1991, and district superintendent from 1991 to 2002. During his tenure, Stevenson High School became the only public high school in Illinois recognized as a National Blue Ribbon School four times.

Following his career at Stevenson, DuFour authored many books and articles and became an education consultant through Solution Tree. He consulted to school districts, professional organizations, universities, and departments of education throughout North America. As an advocate of teacher collaboration, he helped educators implement professional learning communities in their schools and districts.

== Research ==
In Professional Learning Communities at Work: Best Practices for Enhancing Student Achievement (1998), DuFour outlined strategies for creating "professional learning communities" (PLCs) in K–12 schools. DuFour linked increases in student performance to schools where there was a shared vision of leadership, where each member of the teaching-learning community contributed, and where teachers collectively planned activities and then reflected together upon completion.

DuFour further identified the characteristics of a PLC in Getting Started: Reculturing Schools to Become Professional Learning Communities (2002). These schools had collaborative teams, demonstrated collective inquiry, had an action orientation and willingness to experiment, desired continuous improvement, were results-oriented, and exhibited a shared mission, vision, and values.

In Whatever it Takes (2004), DuFour outlined strategies undertaken in schools that refuse to let students fail.

DuFour co-authored Learn by Doing: A Handbook for Professional Learning Communities at Work (2006, 2010, 2016), which provided updated and expanded strategies for PLCs, including the idea that "the key to improved learning for students is continuous job-embedded learning for educators."

DuFour authored eight books, three video-resources, and over 40 professional articles. He also served as a columnist for the Journal of Staff Development.

== Awards ==
DuFour was awarded the "Van Miller Distinguished Scholar Practitioner Award" by the Illinois Association of School Administrators in 2000.

Executive Educator magazine named DuFour one of the "Top 100 School Administrators in North America".

Upon his retirement from superintendent in 2002, the Illinois General Assembly passed a resolution recognizing DuFour's considerable contribution to public education.

== Death ==
DuFour died of cancer on February 8, 2017, age 69 at his home in Forest, Virginia.
