= Will Richardson (educator) =

American author

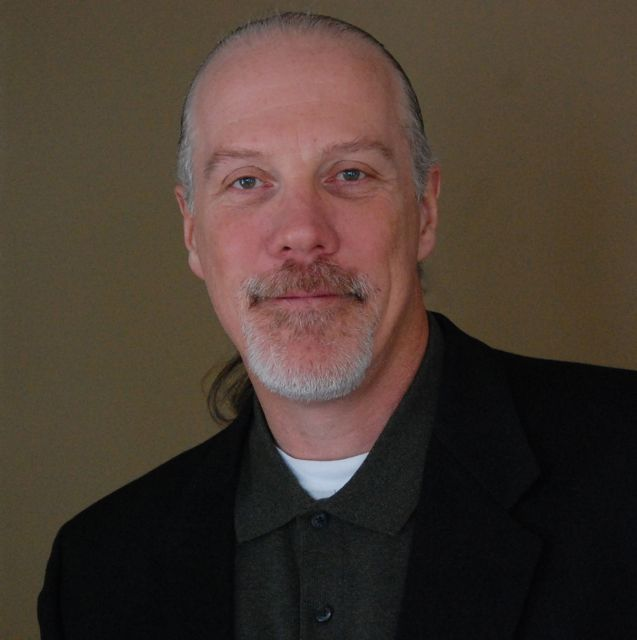
- Will Richardson
- Education: Ohio University
- Occupations: Author, Educationalist
- Spouse: Wendy
- Children: 2
- Writing career
- Genres: Educationist, Author, Teacher, Blogger
- Notable works: Blogs, Wikis, Podcasts, and other Powerful Web Tools for Classrooms
- Website: www.willrichardson.com

Will Richardson is an author and speaker on educational technology. He has many published works, including the book, Blogs, Wikis, Podcasts, and other Powerful Web Tools for Classrooms, and the edublog Weblogg-ed which he wrote from 2001 to 2011. Richardson is also active on the web; he has both a Twitter account and YouTube channel.

Richardson co-founded Modern Learner Media and is co-publisher of ModernLearners.com. He also co-founded Change School, an online learning resource for educators. Richardson is a founding partner of Connective Learning, LLC. He promotes the implementation of Read/Write technologies in K-12 classrooms. He is also an advocate for school reform which encourages the integration of technology in learning. He was also named to the National Advisory Board for the George Lucas Educational Foundation. Along with Sheryl Nussbaum-Beach, he co-founded Powerful Learning Practice, a company that delivers job-embedded, year-long professional development to schools worldwide around the pedagogies of Web 2.0 tools.

District Administration magazine has published a quarterly column by Richardson titled "The Online Edge".

Richardson has been part of a panel presentation at the 2006 Milken Global Conference and has given presentations all over the world.

== Biography ==
Richardson's bio for a February 2007 conference noted that "Will lives along the Delaware River in Western New Jersey with his wife Wendy and his children Tess and Tucker, all of whom are bloggers."

Formerly a teacher at Hunterdon Central Regional High School in Flemington, New Jersey, Richardson was recognized for his use of blogs in the classroom as a "trendsetter in education" in 2003 by The New York Times. In 2017, Forbes named Richardson one of the top five edupreneur voices to follow.

== Education ==
- Bachelor of Science in Journalism, Ohio University, Athens, OH, 1980
- Master of Arts (Teaching), College of New Jersey, Trenton, NJ, 1983

== Published works ==
=== Books ===
- From Master Teacher to Master Learner (Solution Tree Press, 2015)
- Freedom to Learn (Solution Tree Press, 2015)
- Connecting the Dots: Teacher Effectiveness and Deeper Professional Learning (Solution Tree Press, 2015)
- Why School? How Education Must Change When Learning and Information are Everywhere (Kindle Edition, September 2012)
- Personal Learning Networks: Using the Power of Connections to Transform Education (Solution Tree Press, May 2011)
- 21st Century Skills: Rethinking How Students Learn (Chapter) (Solution Tree Press, 2010)
- Engaging the Whole Child: Reflections on Best Practices in Learning, Teaching, and Leadership (Chapter) (ASCD, 2009)
- Weblogs, Wikis, Podcasts and Other Powerful Web Tools that are Transforming Classrooms (March 2006, Corwin Press, 3rd Edition, March 2010)

=== Articles ===
- "For the Love of Learning" District Administration, (October, 2010)
- "No More One-Size Fits All Learning" District Administration, (August, 2010)
- "A New Era of Learning" District Administration (April, 2010)
- "Kids Connecting with Adults Online" District Administration (January, 2010)
- "The New Writing Pedagogy" (Feature) District Administration (November, 2009)
- "Personalized Online Learning" District Administration (September, 2009)
- "Why Schools Should Break the Web 2.0 Barrier" Threshold Magazine (Summer 2009)
- "Leadership Goes Public" District Administration (June, 2009)
- "Making the Web Manageable with Collaborative Filters" District Administration (April, 2009)
- "Becoming Network-Wise" Educational Leadership (March, 2009)
- "World Without Walls: Learning Well With Others" Edutopia (December, 2008)
- "Creating Student Editors" District Administration (December, 2008)
- "Footprints in a Digital World" Educational Leadership (November, 2008)
- "Let's Get Into Groups" District Administration (September, 2008)
- "You Need to be Clickable" District Administration (June, 2008)
- "Building Your Own Personal Learning Network" OnCUE Journal (Summer 2008)
- "Now Playing: The Live Web" District Administration (March, 2008)
- "Teaching Civics with Social Web Tools" District Administration (January, 2008)
- "Building Networks in Schools" District Administration (December, 2007)
- "Locked in an Irrelevant System? Network Building and the New Literacy" Education Canada (Fall, 2007)
- "Social Tools in Schools Taking Root" District Administration (November, 2007)
- "From MySpace to SchoolSpace" District Administration (September, 2007)
- "Education Through Networking" ie Magazine (Summer 2007)
- "From MySpace to SchoolSpace" District Administration (September, 2007)
- "Walking the Web 2.0" District Administration (August, 2007)
- "Teaching in a Web 2.0 World" Kappa Delta Pi Record (Summer 2007)
- "Summer 2.0 Reading" District Administration (July, 2007)
- "Read/Write Web" Classroom Connect Connected Newsletter (Summer, 2007)
- "Apps on the Web" District Administration (June, 2007)
- "Building a Web Presence" District Administration (May, 2007)
- "High Tech Inspires the Read/Write Web" Education Digest (May, 2007)
- "Administrators Who Blog" District Administration (April, 2007)
- "Taming the Beast: Social Bookmarking" School Library Journal (March, 2007).
- "The Seven C's of Learning" District Administration (March, 2007)
- "Podcasting 101" NEA Today (March, 2007)
- "The Read/Write Web: New Tools for a New Generation of Technology" Principal (January/February, 2007)
- "To Block, or Not to Block" District Administration (February, 2007)
- "Online Powered School Libraries" District Administration (January, 2007)
- "Making Waves: With Podcasting, Anyone (Yes, Anyone) Can Create Their Own Radio Show" School Library Journal (October, 2006)
- "The New Face of Learning" Edutopia Magazine (October, 2006)
- "Merrily Down the Stream" School Library Journal (July, 2006)
- "Tech Tools for Learning" Access Learning (January, 2006)
- "An Educator's Guide to the Read/Write Web" Educational Leadership (December, 2005)
- "What's a Wiki? A Powerful Collaborative Tool for Teaching and Learning. That's What!" Multimedia and Internet @ Schools (November, 2005)
- "Blog Revolution: Expanding classroom horizons with Web logs." Technology and Learning Magazine (October, 2005)
- "New Jersey High School Learns the ABCs of Blogging," T.H.E. Journal (June, 2005)
- "The ABCs of RSS." Technology and Learning Magazine (May, 2005)
- "Blogging and RSS: The 'What's It?' and 'How To' of Powerful New Web Tools for Educators" Multimedia and Internet @ Schools (January, 2004)
- "Blogging On." Principal Leadership (November, 2003)
- "Weblogs: Internet Publishing Made Easy," Desien (August, 2003)
- "Web Logs in the English Classroom: More Than Just Chat" English Journal (September, 2003)
