= Discovery learning =

Technique of inquiry-based learning

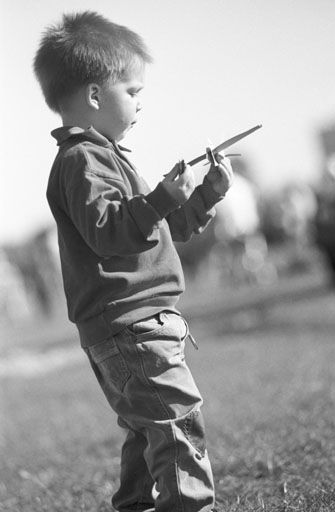
A child explores the flight behavior of a toy aircraft from Styrofoam

Discovery learning is a technique of inquiry-based learning and is considered a constructivist-based approach to education. It is also referred to as problem-based learning, experiential learning, and 21st-century learning. It is supported by the work of learning theorists and psychologists Jean Piaget, Jerome Bruner, and Seymour Papert.

Jerome Bruner is often credited with originating discovery learning in the 1960s, but his ideas are very similar to those of earlier writers such as John Dewey. Bruner argues that "Practice in discovering for oneself teaches one to acquire information in a way that makes that information more readily viable in problem solving". This philosophy later became the discovery-learning movement of the 1960s. The mantra of this philosophical movement suggests that people should "learn by doing".

The label of discovery learning can cover a variety of instructional techniques. According to a meta-analytic review conducted by Alfieri, Brooks, Aldrich, and Tenenbaum (2011), a discovery-learning task can range from implicit pattern detection, to the elicitation of explanations and working through manuals to conducting simulations. Discovery learning can occur whenever the student is not provided with an exact answer but rather the materials in order to find the answer oneself.

Discovery learning takes place in problem-solving situations where learners interact with their environments by exploring and manipulating objects, wrestling with questions and controversies, or performing experiments, while drawing on their own experiences and prior knowledge.

== Characteristics ==
Discovery-based learning is typically characterized by having minimal teacher guidance, having fewer teacher explanations, solving problems with multiple solutions, using hand-on materials, and having minimal repetition and memorization.

There are multiple essential components that are required for successful discovery-based learning, which include the following:

- Teacher guidance where the emphasis is on building upon students' reasoning and connecting to their experiences;
- Classroom culture where there is a shared sense of purpose between teacher and students, where open-mindedness and dialogue are encouraged; and
- Students are encouraged to ask questions, inquire through exploration, and collaborate with teacher and peers.

== Teacher's role ==
It has been suggested that effective teaching using discovery techniques requires teachers to do one or more of the following: 1) Provide guided tasks leveraging a variety of instructional techniques 2) Encourage students to explain their own ideas, which teachers should assess the accuracy of and provide feedback 3) Provide examples of how to complete the tasks.

A critical success factor to discovery learning is that it must be teacher-assisted. Bruner (1961), one of the early pioneers of discovery learning, cautioned that discovery could not happen without some basic knowledge. Mayer (2004) argued that pure unassisted discovery should be eliminated due to the lack of evidence that it improves learning outcomes. Discovery learning can also result in students becoming confused and frustrated.

The teachers' role in discovery learning is therefore critical to the success of learning outcomes. Students must build foundational knowledge through examples, practice, and feedback. This can provide a foundation for students to integrate additional information and build upon problem solving and critical-thinking skills.

== Benefits and limitations ==
Early research demonstrated that directed discovery had positive effects on retention of information at six weeks after instruction versus that of traditional direct instruction.

It is believed that the outcome of discovery based learning is the development of inquiring minds and the potential for life-long learning.

Discovery learning promotes student exploration and collaboration with teachers and peers to solve problems. Children are also able to direct their own inquiry and be actively involved in the learning process, which helps with student motivation.

Discovery learning is not without limitations, however. Some studies show that students in discovery situations are more likely than those receiving direct instruction to encounter inconsistent or misleading feedback, encoding errors, causal misattributions, and inadequate practice and elaborations. In these cases, direct instruction has been shown to be an efficient way to teach procedures that are difficult for students to discover on their own, such as those involved in geometry, algebra, and computer programming.

== Assisted vs. unassisted discovery ==
A debate in the instructional community now questions the effectiveness of this model of instruction. The debate dates back to the 1950s when researchers first began to compare the results of discovery learning to other forms of instruction. In support of the fundamental concept of discovery learning, Bruner (1961) suggested that students are more likely to remember concepts if they discover them on their own as opposed to those that are taught directly.

In pure discovery learning, the learner is required to discover new content through conducting investigations or carrying out procedures while receiving little, if any, assistance. "For example, a science teacher might provide students with a brief demonstration of how perceptions of color change depending on the intensity of the light source and then ask them to design their own experiment to further examine this relationship". In this example the student is left to discover the content on one's own. Because students are left to self-discovery of topics, researchers worry that the learning taking place may have errors or misconceptions, or be confusing or frustrating to the learner.

Research shows that cognitive demands required for discovery in young children may hinder learning as they have limited amounts of existing knowledge to integrate additional information. Bruner also cautioned that such discovery could not be made prior to or without at least some base of knowledge in the topic. Students who are presented with problems without foundational knowledge may not have the ability to work though solutions. The meta-analyses conducted by Alfieri and colleagues reconfirmed such findings.

Mayer (2004) argues that unassisted discovery learning tasks do not help learners discover problem-solving rules, conservation strategies, or programming concepts. He does acknowledge, however that while under some circumstances constructivist-based approaches may be beneficial, pure discovery learning lacks structure in nature and hence will not be beneficial for the learner. Mayer also points out that interest in discovery learning has waxed and waned since the 1960s. He argues that in each case the empirical literature has shown that the use of pure discovery methods is not suggested, yet time and time again researchers have renamed their instructional methods only to be discredited again, to rename their movement again.

Alternatively, direct instruction with working examples, scaffolding techniques, explicit explanation and feedback are beneficial to learning (Alfieri, 2011). In addition, time spent practising newly learned concepts improves problem solving skills (Pas and Van Gog, 2006).

There appears to be benefits to both direct instruction and assisted discovery.

== In special-needs education ==
With the push for special-needs students to take part in the general-education curriculum, prominent researchers in this field doubt if general-education classes rooted in discovery-based learning can provide an adequate learning environment for special-needs students. Kauffman has related his concerns over the use of discovery-based learning as opposed to direct instruction. Kauffman comments that, to be highly successful in learning the facts and skills they need, these facts and skills must be taught directly rather than indirectly. That is, the teacher is in control of instruction, not the student, and information is given to students (2002).

This view is exceptionally strong when focusing on students with math disabilities and math instruction. Fuchs et al. (2008) comment,

Typically developing students profit from the general education mathematics program, which relies, at least in part, on a constructivist, inductive instructional style. Students who accrue serious mathematics deficits, however, fail to profit from those programs in a way that produces understanding of the structure, meaning, and operational requirements of mathematics ... Effective intervention for students with a math disability requires an explicit, didactic form of instruction ...

Fuchs et al. go on to note that explicit or direct instruction should be followed up with instruction that anticipates misunderstanding and counters it with precise explanations.

However, few studies focus on the long-term results for direct instruction. Long-term studies may find that direct instruction is not superior to other instructional methods. For instance, a study found that, in a group of fourth graders that were instructed for 10 weeks and measured for 17 weeks, direct instruction did not lead to any stronger results in the long term than did practice alone. Other researchers note that there is promising work being done in the field to incorporate constructivism and cooperative grouping so that curriculum and pedagogy can meet the needs of diverse learners in an inclusion setting. However, it is questionable how successful these developed strategies are for student outcomes both initially and in the long term.

== Effects on cognitive load ==
Research has been conducted over years to prove the unfavorable effects of discovery learning, specifically with beginning learners. "Cognitive load theory suggests that the free exploration of a highly complex environment may generate a heavy working memory load that is detrimental to learning". Beginning learners do not have the necessary skills to integrate the new information with information they have learned in the past. Sweller reported that a better alternative to discovery learning was guided instruction. According to Kirschner, Sweller, and Clark (2006), guided instruction produces more immediate recall of facts than unguided approaches along with longer-term transfer and problem-solving skills.

== Enhanced discovery learning ==
Robert J. Marzano (2011) describes enhanced discovery learning as a process that involves preparing the learner for the discovery-learning task by providing the necessary knowledge needed to successfully complete said task. In this approach, the teacher not only provides the necessary knowledge required to complete the task, but also provides assistance during the task. This preparation of the learner and assistance may require some direct instruction. "For example, before asking students to consider how best to stretch the hamstring muscle in cold weather, the teacher might present a series of lessons that clarify basic facts about muscles and their reaction to changes in temperature".

Another aspect of enhanced discovery learning is allowing the learner to generate ideas about a topic along the way and then having students explain their thinking. A teacher who asks the students to generate their own strategies for solving a problem may be provided with examples in how to solve similar problems ahead of the discovery learning task. "A student might come up to the front of the room to work through the first problem, sharing his or her thinking out loud. The teacher might question students and help them formulate their thinking into general guidelines for estimation, such as 'start by estimating the sum of the highest place-value numbers'. As others come to the front of the room to work their way through problems out loud, students can generate and test more rules".

== See also ==
- Active learning
- Cognitive load
- Constructivism (learning theory)
- Inquiry-based learning
- Jerome Bruner
- Moore method
- Problem-based learning
- Progressive education
- Science education
