= Robert J. Marzano =

Educational researcher

- Education: University of Washington
- Known for: Educational research
- Website: www.marzanoresources.com www.marzanocenter.com

Robert J. Marzano is an educational researcher in the United States. He has done educational research and theory on the topics of standards-based assessment, cognition, high-yield teaching strategies, and school leadership, including the development of practical programs and tools for teachers and administrators in K–12 schools.

Marzano is co-founder and CEO of Marzano Research in Centennial, Colorado. In 2012, the U.S. Department of Education's Institute of Education Sciences created the Regional Educational Laboratory (Central) at the Marzano Research, one of ten similar laboratories across the United States. Marzano was named executive director. He is also Executive Director of Learning Sciences Marzano Center in West Palm Beach, Florida.

== Research ==
Marzano proposed the Theory of Dimensions of Learning Model (introduced in 1992), based on his research on learning and the way the mind works during learning. The assumptions in his model are that the process of learning involves close interaction of five dimensions of thinking ("as loose metaphors"). These being: (1) developing positive attitudes and perceptions about learning; (2) acquiring and integrating knowledge; (3) extending and refining knowledge; (4) using knowledge meaningfully; and (5) developing productive habits of mind.

Marzano has identified three areas central to school improvement reforms: fostering and sustaining system-wide teaching strategies; providing effective feedback to students; and building a strong student academic vocabulary.

In Classroom Instruction That Works (2001), Marzano and co-authors Debra J. Pickering and Jane E. Pollock outlined nine instructional strategies likely to improve student achievement across all grade levels and subject areas:

1. Identifying similarities and differences.
2. Summarizing and note taking.
3. Reinforcing effort and providing recognition.
4. Homework and practice.
5. Non-linguistic representations.
6. Cooperative learning.
7. Setting objectives and providing feedback.
8. Generating and testing hypotheses.
9. Cues, questions, and advance organizers.

In 2003, Marzano co-authored Classroom Management That Works: Research-Based Strategies for Every Teacher, which examined effective disciplinary interventions for teachers. They outlined practical steps teachers could implement in classrooms, including establishing rules and procedures; using effective disciplinary interventions; fostering positive student-teacher relationships; developing an effective mental set; and instilling student responsibility.

Marzano also includes that only half of classroom time is instruction, the other half is discipline. He outlines several critical dimensions of classroom management that Jacob Kounin (1970) discovered. These include "withitness", the idea of a teacher being completely aware of all students in his/her classroom through monitoring and adjusting; smoothness and momentum during lesson presentations; letting students know what behavior is expected of them at any given point in time; and creating variability and challenge in assignments and tasks. Marzano says:

'Withitness' involves a keen awareness of disruptive behavior or potentially disruptive behavior and immediate attention to that behavior; of the four dimensions, it is the one that most consistently separates the excellent classroom managers from the average or below-average classroom managers.

Marzano is co-creator, with Learning Sciences Marzano Center, of the Marzano Hierarchical Evaluation System, which includes evaluation models for teacher, school leader, non-classroom instructor, and district leader evaluation. He is a leader in research on evidence-based education, and continues his research through his company, Marzano Research.

== Education ==
Marzano received a Bachelor of Arts degree in English from Iona College, and a master's degree in reading and language arts from Seattle University. His doctorate was in curriculum and instruction from the University of Washington.

== Awards ==
Marzano was the recipient of the 2008 Brock International Prize in Education.

== Publications ==
Marzano has authored or co-authored more than 50 books and 200 articles, including:

Books:

- Assessing Student Outcomes: Performance Assessment Using the Dimensions of Learning Model (1993).
- Models of Standards Implementation: Implications for the Classroom (1998).
- Transforming Classroom Grading (2000).
- Classroom Instruction that Works: Research-Based Strategies for Increasing Student Achievement (2001).
- What Works in Schools: Translating Research into Action (2003).
- Classroom Assessment & Grading That Work (2006).
- The Art and Science of Teaching (2007).
- Teacher Evaluation that Makes a Difference (2013).
- Leaders of Learning (2011).
- A Handbook for High Reliability Schools (2014).
- Awaken the Learner (2014).
- Managing the Inner World of Teaching (2015).
- Collaborative Teams that Transform Schools (2016).
- Motivating and Inspiring Students: Strategies to Awaken the Learner (2016).
- The New Art and Science of Teaching (2017).
- A Handbook for Personalized Competency-Based Education (2017).
- Making Classroom Assessments Reliable and Valid (2017).
- Leading a High Reliability School™ (2018).
- The New Art and Science of Teaching Writing (2018).
- The New Art and Science of Teaching Reading (2018).
- The New Art and Science of Classroom Assessment (2018).
- The Handbook for the New Art and Science of Teaching (2018).
- The New Art and Science of Teaching Mathematics (2019).
- The New Art and Science of Teaching Art and Music (2019).
