= Professional learning community =

Method to foster collaborative learning

A professional learning community (PLC) is a method to foster collaborative learning among colleagues within a particular work environment or field. It is often used in schools as a way to organize teachers into working groups of practice-based professional learning.

== History ==
The phrase professional learning community began to be used in the 1990s after Peter Senge's book The Fifth Discipline (1990) had popularized the idea of learning organizations, related to the idea of reflective practice espoused by Donald Schön in books such as The Reflective Turn: Case Studies in and on Educational Practice (1991). Charles B. Myers and Lynn K. Myers used the phrase professional learning community in relation to schools in their 1995 book The Professional Educator: A New Introduction to Teaching and Schools, and a year later Charles B. Myers presented a paper at the annual meeting of the American Educational Research Association titled "Beyond the PDS: Schools as Professional Learning Communities" that proposed a path from professional development school (PDS) efforts to schools as professional learning communities. In 1997, Shirley M. Hord issued a white paper titled "Professional Learning Communities: Communities of Continuous Inquiry and Improvement". A year later, Richard DuFour and Robert E. Eaker published the book Professional Learning Communities at Work. Since the late 1990s, a large literature on PLCs has been published.

== Definitions ==
PLCs have many variations. In Shirley M. Hord's 1997 definition, it means "extending classroom practice into the community; bringing community personnel into the school to enhance the curriculum and learning tasks for students; or engaging students, teachers, and administrators simultaneously in learning". Hord noted that the benefits of professional learning community to educators and students include reduced isolation of teachers, better informed and committed teachers, and academic gains for students. In 1998, Richard DuFour and Robert E. Eaker explained:

If schools are to be significantly more effective, they must break from the industrial model upon which they were created and embrace a new model that enables them to function as learning organizations. We prefer characterizing learning organizations as "professional learning communities" for several vital reasons. While the term "organization" suggests a partnership enhanced by efficiency, expediency, and mutual interests, "community" places greater emphasis on relationships, shared ideals, and a strong culture—all factors that are critical to school improvement. The challenge for educators is to create a community of commitment—a professional learning community. [...] It sounds simple enough, but as the old adage warns, "the devil is in the details." Educators willing to embrace the concept of the school as a professional learning community will be given ambiguous, oftentimes conflicting advice on how they should proceed.

— Richard DuFour and Robert E. Eaker, Professional Learning Communities at Work

In 2004, DuFour stated that initiating and sustaining a PLC "requires the school staff to focus on learning rather than teaching, work collaboratively on matters related to learning, and hold itself accountable for the kind of results that fuel continual improvement". In 2005, the Ontario Ministry of Education defined a PLC as "a shared vision for running a school in which everyone can make a contribution, and staff are encouraged to collectively undertake activities and reflection in order to constantly improve their students' performance".

Michael Fullan has noted that "in the spread of PLCs, we have found that the term travels a lot faster than the concept, a finding common to all innovations. The concept is deep and requires careful and persistent attention in thorough learning by reflective doing and problem solving." Fullan also noted: "Transforming the culture of schools and the systems within which they operate is the main point. It is not an innovation to be implemented, but rather a new culture to be developed."

== Attributes ==
There are many core characteristics of PLCs including collective teamwork in which leadership and responsibility for student learning are extensively shared, a focus on reflective inquiry and dialogue among educators, collective emphasis on improving student learning, shared values and norms, and development of common practices and feedback.

The 2005 report by the Ontario Ministry of Education titled Education for All indicates the characteristics of PLCs are as follows:

- Shared vision and values that lead to a collective commitment of school staff, which is expressed in day-to-day practices
- Solutions actively sought, openness to new ideas
- Working teams cooperate to achieve common goals
- Encouragement of experimentation as an opportunity to learn
- Questioning of the status quo, leading to an ongoing quest for improvement and professional learning
- Continuous improvement based on evaluation of outcomes rather than on the intentions expressed
- Reflection in order to study the operation and impacts of actions taken

== Supporting conditions ==
Around the time that the term professional learning community was coined, a group of education researchers became interested in the similar idea of "professional community" in schools. Based on data they collected in their research for the Center on Organization and Restructuring of Schools, Sharon Kruse, Karen Seashore Louis, and Anthony Bryk developed a three-part framework to describe the critical elements and supportive conditions that are necessary to establish a healthy "professional" culture. The components of this framework are described in the following table. Kruse and colleagues found that "in schools where professional community is strong, teachers work together more effectively, and put more efforts into creating and sustaining opportunities for student learning." They also suggested that the social and human resources are more important than the structural conditions in the development of professional community.

Professional culture in schools
Critical elements
Reflective dialogue	De-privatization of practice	Collective focus on student learning	Collaboration	Shared norms and values
Supporting conditions
Structural conditions: Time to meet and talk; Physical proximity; Interdependent teaching roles; Communication structures; Teacher empowerment and school autonomy			Social and human resources: Openness to improvement; Trust and respect; Cognitive and skill base; Supportive leadership; Socialization	

== Use of data ==
In their 2015 examination of middle school mathematics teachers' collaborative conversations regarding student data, Jason Brasel, Brette Garner, Britnie Kane and Ilana Horn found that the teachers used data to answer four questions:

- "What do we need to reteach?"
- "To whom do we need to reteach it?"
- "Why did students struggle with this?"
- "How do we reteach it?"

The matrix in the following table shows how Brasel and colleagues found that the teachers combined these four questions to learn about two dimensions of teaching: student thinking and instruction. The authors found that while the most productive collaborative discussions—that allowed the teachers to learn more about mathematics content, students and pedagogy—focused more on why and how, the teachers tended to address only the first two questions, what and to whom. While these conversations were helpful in identifying students in need of remediation, they did little in the way to improve instruction in the long run.

		Learning about instruction	
		Weak	Strong
Learning about student thinking	Weak	Targeted reteaching: What?; To whom?	Tips and tricks: What?; To whom and how?
Learning about student thinking	Strong	Bounded improvement: What and why?; To whom?	Responsive revisioning: What and why?; To whom and how?

== Staff development ==
=== Barriers to implementation ===
Teachers and other educators can feel as if they are pawns in a larger game of chess where school and district leaders are making decisions that cause problems for educators trying to do their jobs. Barriers that can inhibit the development of PLCs include subject areas, because some educational subjects tend to naturally take precedence over others. The physical layout of the school can be another obstacle.

In the book Intentional Interruption: Breaking Down Learning Barriers to Professional Practice, Steven Katz and Lisa Ain Dack identified six mental barriers to learning in PLCs: "we don't think through all possibilities; we focus on confirming our hypotheses and not challenging them; we pay too much attention to things that are vivid; we consider ourselves to be exceptions; we hesitate to take action in a new direction; we don't want others to see our vulnerabilities". Katz and Dack opt for a psychological definition of learning: "Learning is the process through which experience causes permanent change in knowledge or behaviour". It is the characteristic of permanence which raises the bar for all professional learning, because learning as permanent change is not easy or natural to achieve. Katz and Dack urge designers of professional learning to avoid the "activity trap" of assuming that participation in a protocol or process guarantees real learning has occurred or putting so much emphasis on the activity that learning is lost in the shuffle.

Because of these difficulties many teachers are turning to the web for PLCs. Teachers are finding groups through Twitter, Facebook, and other social media websites that allow them to interact with teachers from across their country to brainstorm and exchange ideas. These groups can be helpful for those with PLCs already at their current school and those without PLCs.

=== Staff as a community ===
A PLC can be seen as an effective staff development team approach and a strategy for school improvement. The PLC process aims to be a reflective process where both individual and community growth is achieved, connected with the school's shared vision for learning. In his book The Fifth Discipline, Peter Senge commented on the importance of building shared vision:

The practice of shared vision involves the skills of unearthing shared "pictures of the future" that foster genuine commitment and enrollment rather than compliance. In mastering this discipline, leaders learn the counter-productiveness of trying to dictate a vision, no matter how heartfelt.

— Peter Senge, The Fifth Discipline

Creation of a shared vision involves sharing diverse ideas and making compromises so that all members are satisfied with the direction in which the organization is moving. Conflicting goals can become a source of positive development: "Top-down mandates and bottom-up energies need each other".

Through this commitment and creation of a shared vision the team may become empowered to work together and achieve goals. As teachers' capacity increases and they develop a sense of professional growth, they may find they are able to reach goals they could not reach on their own.

In an educational setting, a PLC may include people from multiple levels of the organization who are collaboratively and continually working together for the betterment of the organization. Peter Senge believes "it is no longer sufficient to have one person learning for the organization". A major principle of PLCs is that people learn more together than if they were on their own, if conditions are right. Teachers may promote the idea of team learning to students in their classrooms, but teachers may not practice team learning in their professional lives; PLCs aim to help teachers practice the team learning that they preach. Senge suggests that when teams learn together there are beneficial results for the organization. Some school improvement evaluators have even claimed that "high-quality collaboration has become no less than an imperative".

== Leadership ==
For a school to be fully committed to implementing PLCs, the school's leadership must help establish and maintain PLCs. Successful PLCs will require a shift in the traditional leadership structure from leader-centered (top-down) to shared leadership. Sue C. Thompson and her colleagues pointed out how many educators often feel that "new ideas that came from someone else without teacher input" are a waste of time and do not qualify as true leadership or support. In a PLC, the view of the principal as the instructional leader changes to a view that reflects the principal as a member of a community of learners and leaders.

== See also ==
- Community of inquiry
- Learning community
- Lifelong learning
