= Child development of the Indigenous peoples of the Americas =

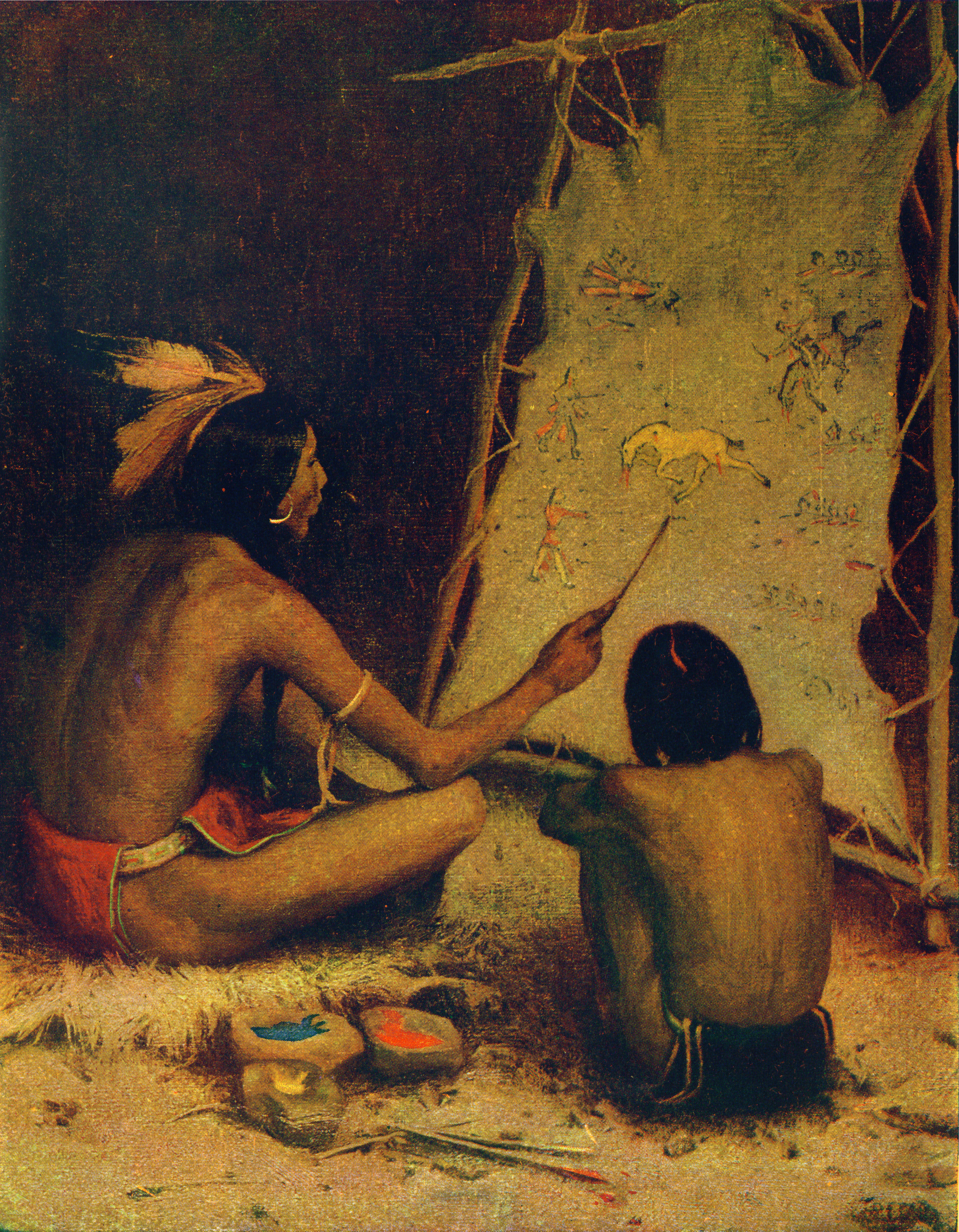
E. Irving Couse, "The Historian", 1902. Quote: "The Indian Artist is painting in sign language, on buckskin, the story of a battle with American Soldiers. When exhibited at the National Academy this picture was considered one of the most important paintings of the year. The dots he is making are bullets."

Styles of children’s learning across various indigenous communities in the Americas have been practiced for centuries prior to European colonization and persist today. Despite extensive anthropological research, efforts made towards studying children’s learning and development in Indigenous communities of the Americas as its own discipline within Developmental Psychology, has remained rudimentary. However, studies that have been conducted reveal several larger thematic commonalities, which create a paradigm of children’s learning that is fundamentally consistent across differing cultural communities.

== Ways of learning ==
A common learning process in Indigenous American communities is characterized as Learning by Observing and Pitching In to everyday family and community activities (LOPI). Learning through observation and pitching in integrate children into their community activities and encourage their participation, so that they become eager to take initiative to collaborate with their community among different tasks independently. The overarching concept of learning by observing and pitching-in can be broken down into smaller theoretical subdivisions which interact and are not mutually exclusive: For one, these communities encourage incorporation of children into ongoing familial and community endeavors. Treating children as legitimate participants who are expected to contribute based on their individual skills and interests, aids their integration as active contributors towards mature processes and activities within their respective communities.

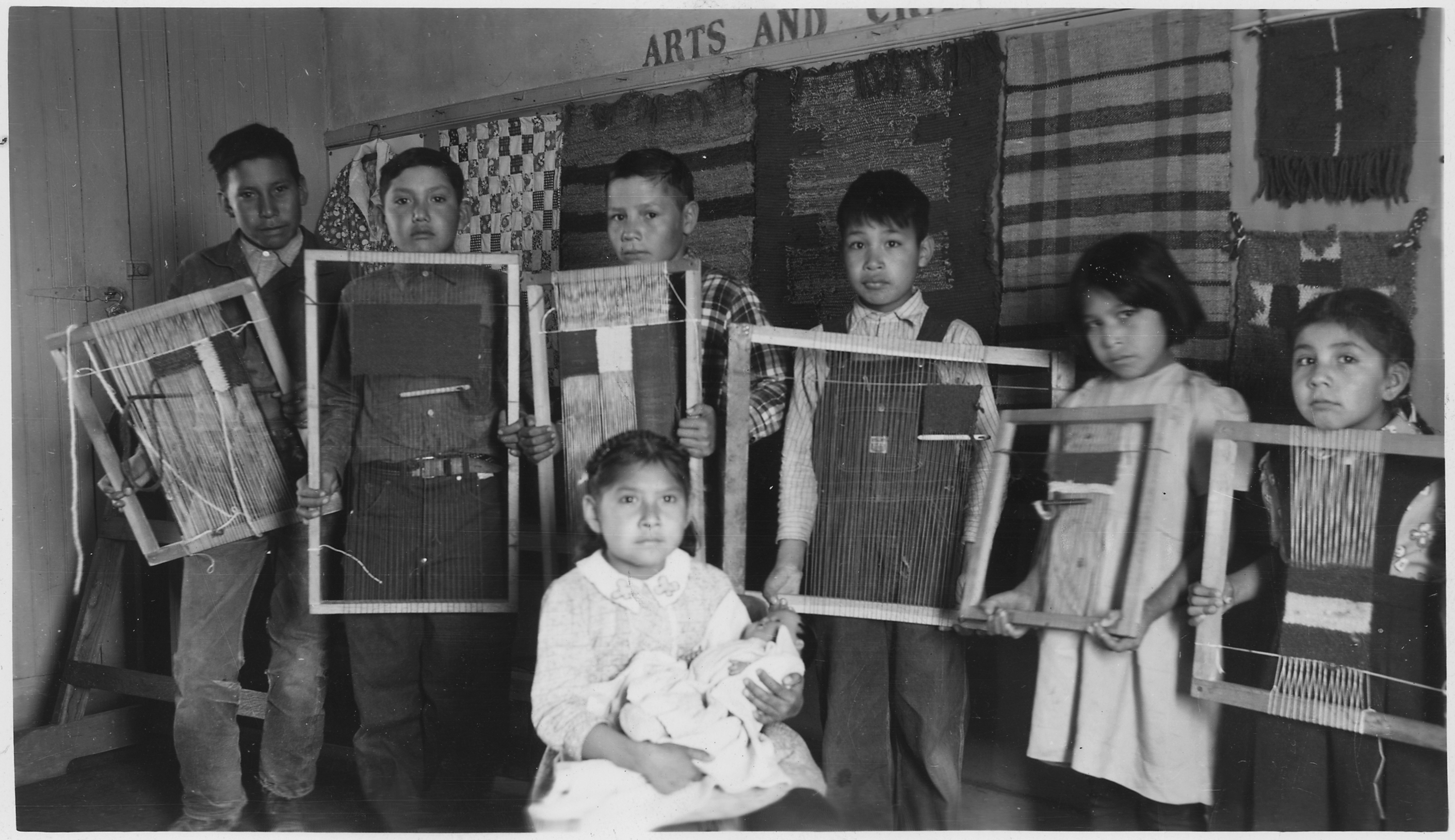
Children of the Central Plains Region (Kansas City) hold arts and crafts class projects in 1941

Community endeavors are approached collaboratively as a group. This allows for flexible leadership and fluid coordination with one another to successfully facilitate such activities. With a relatively neutral platform for everyone to be actively engaged, an environment is promoted where learning to blend differing ideas, agendas and pace is necessary and thus, encouraged. This flexible organization also promotes mixed-age socialization while working, such as storytelling and jokes, from which these children build morals and connections. In this way, tasks become anticipated social endeavors, rather than chores.

In most Indigenous American communities, communication and learning occurs when all participants view a shared reference to encourage familiarity with the task. Moreover, it incorporates usage of both verbal and nonverbal communication. When explanations are provided, it is coupled with the activity so that it can be a means of further understanding or easier execution of the ongoing/anticipated activity at hand. In addition, narratives and dramatizations are often used as a tool to guide learning and development because it helps contextualize information and ideas in the form of remembered or hypothetical scenarios. Furthermore, narratives in Indigenous American communities serve as a non-confrontational method of guiding children's development. Due to the fact that it is considered impolite and embarrassing to directly single out a child for improper behavior, narratives and dramatizations serve as a subtle way to inform and direct children's learning.

=== Goal of Learning ===
The goal of learning is about the transformation of participation in which other important skills and information are acquired in the process (i.e. responsibility, consideration, observation, etc.). Learning fosters integration within the community and activates the development of socialization skills. Learning also promotes the aggregation of knowledge of cultural practices and spirituality. For example, the Mazahua fifth- and sixth-grade students shifted their roles within the class by making a transformation between being a bystander and actually being considerate enough to contribute without being told to do so. This process of participation greatly influences role-switching or role-taking among society in which all participants contribute to the successful completion of a task by watching, observing, and collaborating as well. This allows the students to take on the responsibility to continue their school work even when the teacher was not present for a few days.

=== Motivation to participate and learn ===
Another crucial component of child development deals with the initiative and self-induced motivation of the learners (or children) themselves. Their eagerness to contribute, ability to execute roles, and search for a sense of belonging helps mold them into valued members of both their families and communities alike. The value placed on “shared work” or help emphasizes how learning and even motivation are related to the way the children participate and contribute to their family and community. One of the motivational factors that contribute to Indigenous children’s learning stems from “inherent motivation” where the child feels a sense of accomplishment or contentment in helping their family or community because the contribution emphasizes their roles and value in their community. Indigenous children take pride in their contributions to the community. When they contribute to their household, children are able to see the value and importance of their work as it helps maintain their family's well-being. The children are motivated to observe and learn because they are aware that they are making an important contribution to the family or community; they feel pride and a sense of self-worth as they help provide for their younger siblings, family, and community. Through such “inherent motivation,” children are expected to learn community practices in order to become valuable contributors to the community. In addition, an authentic or natural setting could be considered just as important in children’s learning as a teacher. This is because Indigenous children learn many of their skills from observing their surroundings and participating in activities with their peers and other members of the community.

=== Keen Attention and Guidance ===
In some indigenous communities in the Americas, children learn by a means of observing and contributing in everyday life with careful attention. These processes of learning are part of a larger system of Indigenous learning studied by Rogoff and colleagues called Learning through Observing and Pitching In (LOPI). These observations and contributions are guided through community expectations the child learns from a young age. The children are a part of the community and are respected in their attempts to contribute and subsequently learn that their participation is valued. Children are included in everyday life and work in the community, and assembly line instruction may not be used as a way to educate children in these communities. Zinacantec infants spend approximately 70% of their first eight months strapped to their caregivers backs. These children observe everyday life from the perspective of their caregiver. They are fully integrated into society because of their close physical proximity to their mothers. Motivation to learn is a product of the learner’s inclusion into the major activities and prioritized goals of the community. The child feels that they are part of the community and actively try to contribute and learn without structured formal instruction.

Guidance from community-wide expectations is an important facet of learning through keen attention for Indigenous children. During interactions where children are integrated into family and community contexts, role-switching, a practice in which roles and responsibilities in completing a task are alternated, is common for the less-experienced to learn from the more-experienced. Requiring keen attention and guidance from those involved, role-switching challenges the observing participant to pay close attention to the actively-contributing participant. When these roles are reversed, the formerly observing-participant will have the opportunity to apply what they just observed. For example, in Nocutzepo communities of Mexico, children learn by observing, listening, and paying close attention to others’ tasks in the kitchen. Mothers indirectly show their child how to shape tortillas with subtle gestures while the child carefully watches and imitates their movements. The mother encourages the child by allowing them to mess up, learn, and continue until she serves the tortillas with the child’s best at the top of the pile. With the understanding that each member of the community has a responsibility to contribute, more experienced members support learners by providing suggestions for how to fulfill the task at hand while the learner's responsibility is to pay close attention.

Keen attention and subtle guidance are present in child development in Indigenous American communities with guidance that focuses on the task and the child’s participation. Guidance that supports child-centered initiatives include allowing children to take initiative in managing their own attention, using subtle nonverbal cues, and giving children feedback without praise. These forms of guidance have a focus on collaboration and synchronicity within the community and between individuals. They were observed in the interactions of children with their Mexican-American teachers in a classroom setting. Mexican-American teachers with indigenous-influenced backgrounds facilitate smooth, back-and-forth coordination when working with students and in these interactions, guidance of children’s attention is not forced. A teacher will focus more on their own understanding of the task they are teaching, use natural intonation, flow of conversation, and non-rhetorical questions with the children to guide, but not control their learning. Different learning cues through guidance from the teacher and keen attention from the child are employed to identify when someone is more able to contribute to the larger group or the community.

=== Storytelling ===
The development of children’s understanding of the world and their community is reflected in the numerous storytelling practices within Indigenous communities. Stories are often employed in order to pass on moral and cultural lessons throughout generations of Indigenous peoples, and are rarely used as a unidirectional transference of knowledge. Rather, narratives and dramatizations contextualize information and children are encouraged to participate and observe storytelling rituals in order to take part in the knowledge exchange between elder and child. The exchange of knowledge is also carried on for generations to come.

=== Parenting ===
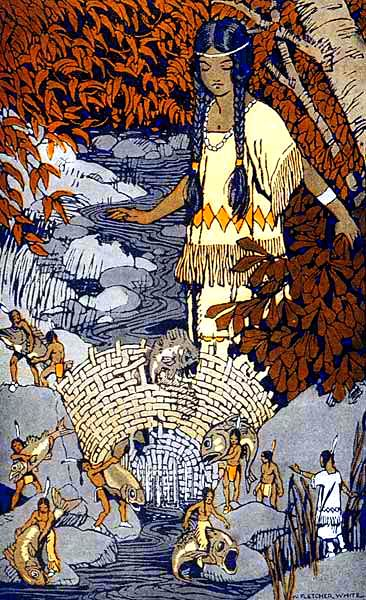
An illustration of "Morning Star" from the book "Stories the Iroquois Tell Their Children", by Mabel Powers 1917

In such cultures, community members have nearly as much agency as the child's parents in the child’s learning. Parents (and other community members) instill indirect support to activities, encouraging autonomy and self-responsibility. Learning and everyday endeavors are not mutually exclusive. Because the children are incrementally eased into taking a bigger part in the community, processes, tasks, and activities are adequately completed with no compromise to quality. Hence, the community is not weary of task risks simply due to the presence and involvement of children. Contrasted with patterns of parent-child engagement in Western communities, it is evident that child learning participation and interaction styles are relative socio-cultural constructs. Factors such as historical context, values, beliefs, and practices must be incorporated into the interpretation of a cultural community and children’s acquisition of knowledge should not be considered universal. Some Indigenous communities pass on knowledge through nonverbal communication, storytelling, teasing and monitoring. All these tools lend to the learning necessary to develop by immersion into the productive activities of the community.

Parents are not the only source that children learn from. Siblings tell us that although both first-born and later-born children learn from a single parent, usually their mother, both children’s speech patterns differ because the older sibling is now more like a caregiver. In the Chillihuani community, a young boy did not learn the flute from his mother or father but by observing his brother, who learned by observing his father. These traditions continuously are being passed down through generations.

=== Assessment of learning ===
The process of assessment includes appraisal of both the learner’s progress towards mastery, and the success of support being given to the learner. Assessment occurs during a task so that it can strengthen the overall contribution being made. Then, feedback is given of the final product or effort to contribute, where it is either accepted and appreciated by others, or corrected to make future endeavors more productive. Thus, the evaluation process is ongoing and coexists with the task itself, rather than occurring after the task is completed. Assessment can also be non-verbal through hands-on correction or by performing visual cues to the learner to guide them.

== See also ==
- Cultural context of indigenous learning in the Americas
- Early childhood education
- Mythologies of the indigenous peoples of North America
- Childhood in Maya society
- Tēlpochcalli
- Indigenous education
- Collaborative learning
