= Storytelling =

Social and cultural sharing of stories

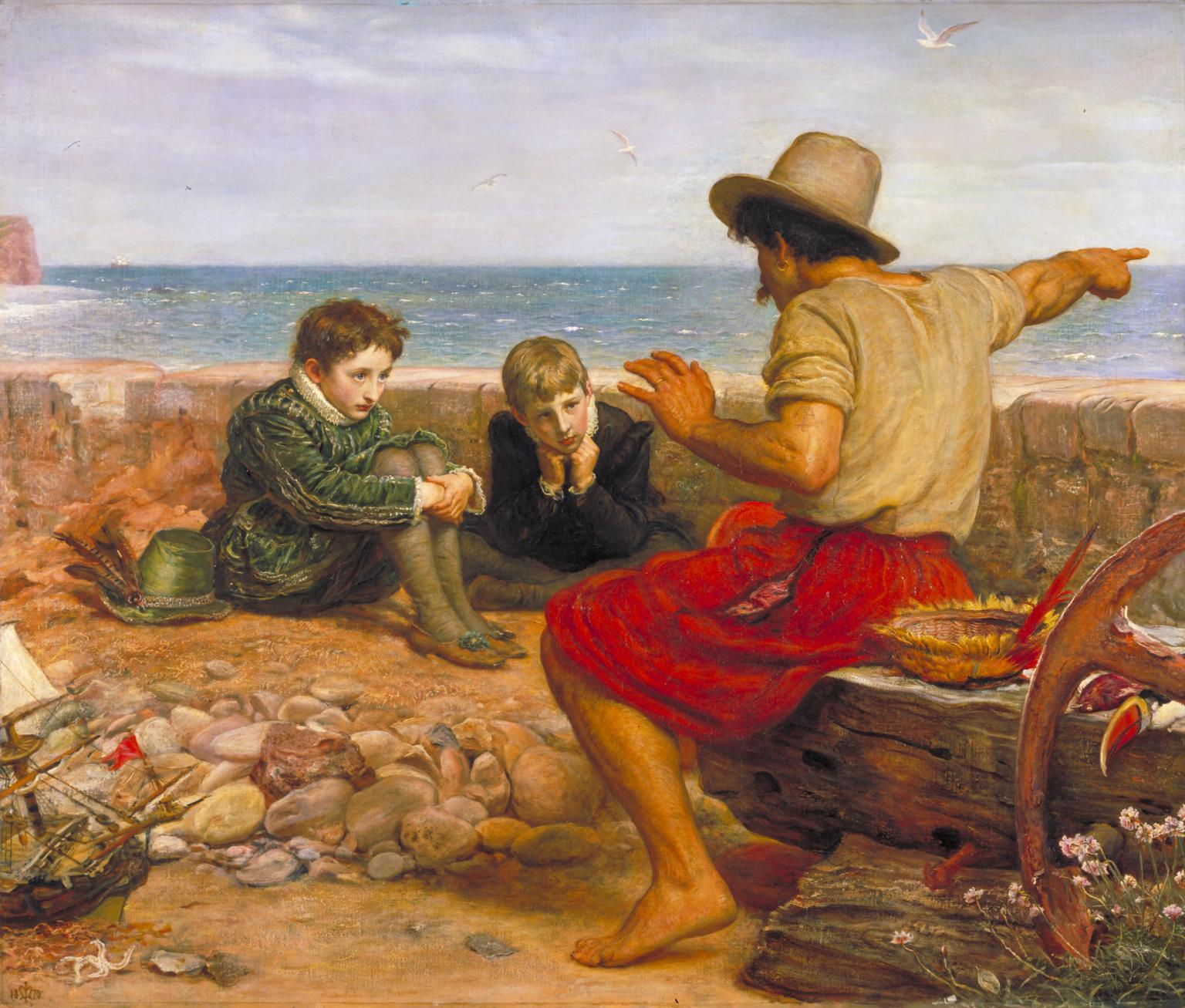
The Boyhood of Raleigh by Sir John Everett Millais, oil on canvas, 1870. A seafarer tells the young Walter Raleigh and his brother the story of what happened out at sea.

Storytelling is the social and cultural activity of sharing stories, sometimes with improvisation, theatrics, or embellishment. Every culture has its own narratives, which are shared as a means of entertainment, education, cultural preservation, or instilling moral values (sometimes through morals). Crucial elements of stories and storytelling include plot, characters, and narrative point of view. The term "storytelling" can refer specifically to oral storytelling but also broadly to techniques used in other media to unfold or disclose the narrative of a story.

== Historical perspective ==
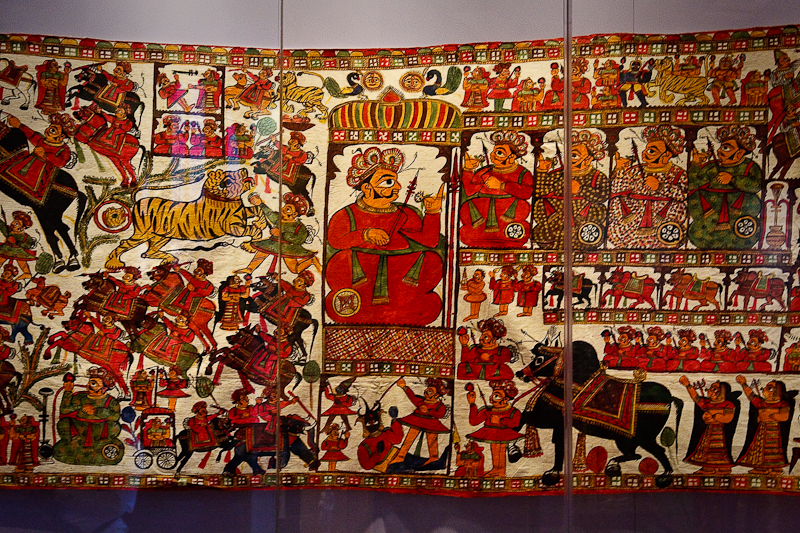
A phad painting dated 1938 A.D. The epic of Pabuji is an oral epic in the Rajasthani language that tells of the deeds of the folk hero-deity Pabuji, who lived in the 14th century.

Storytelling, which is intertwined with the development of mythologies, predates written history. The first human languages had likely emerged by 80,000 BCE and were spoken or signed, or a combination of the two, but even the most basic languages allow the framing of hypotheticals, suggesting that the first language speakers could already tell stories. Stating a hypothetical, and telling a story about it may have provided a survival advantage to early human groups who developed it, creating an evolutionary pressure that favoured this cognitive development.

Storytelling often has a prominent educational and performative role in religious rituals (for example, the Passover Seder), and some archaeologists believe that rock art may have served as a form of storytelling for many ancient cultures, including the Aboriginal peoples of Australia.

The Aboriginal Australian people painted symbols which also appear in stories on cave walls as a means of helping the storyteller remember the story. The story was then told using a combination of oral narrative, music, rock art and dance, which brings understanding and meaning to human existence through the remembrance and enactment of stories. People have used the carved trunks of living trees and ephemeral media (such as sand and leaves) to record folktales in pictures or with writing. Complex forms of tattooing may also represent stories, with information about genealogy, affiliation and social status.

Folktales often share common motifs and themes, suggesting possible basic psychological similarities across various human cultures. Other stories, notably fairy tales, appear to have spread from place to place, implying memetic appeal and popularity.

An Indian folktale called 'Bihula Bishari' popular in Bihar state

Groups of originally oral tales can coalesce over time into story cycles (like the Arabian Nights), cluster around mythic heroes (like King Arthur), and develop into the narratives of the deeds of the gods and saints of various religions. The results can be episodic (like the stories about Anansi), epic (as with Homeric tales), inspirational (note the tradition of vitae) and/or instructive (as in many Buddhist or Christian scriptures).

With the advent of writing and the use of stable, portable media, storytellers recorded, transcribed and continued to share stories over wide regions of the world. Stories have been carved, scratched, painted, printed or inked onto wood or bamboo, ivory and other bones, pottery, clay tablets, stone, palm-leaf books, skins (parchment), bark cloth, paper, silk, canvas and other textiles, recorded on film and stored electronically in digital form. Oral stories continue to be created, improvisationally by impromptu and professional storytellers, as well as committed to memory and passed from generation to generation, despite the increasing popularity of written and televised media in much of the world.

== Contemporary storytelling ==
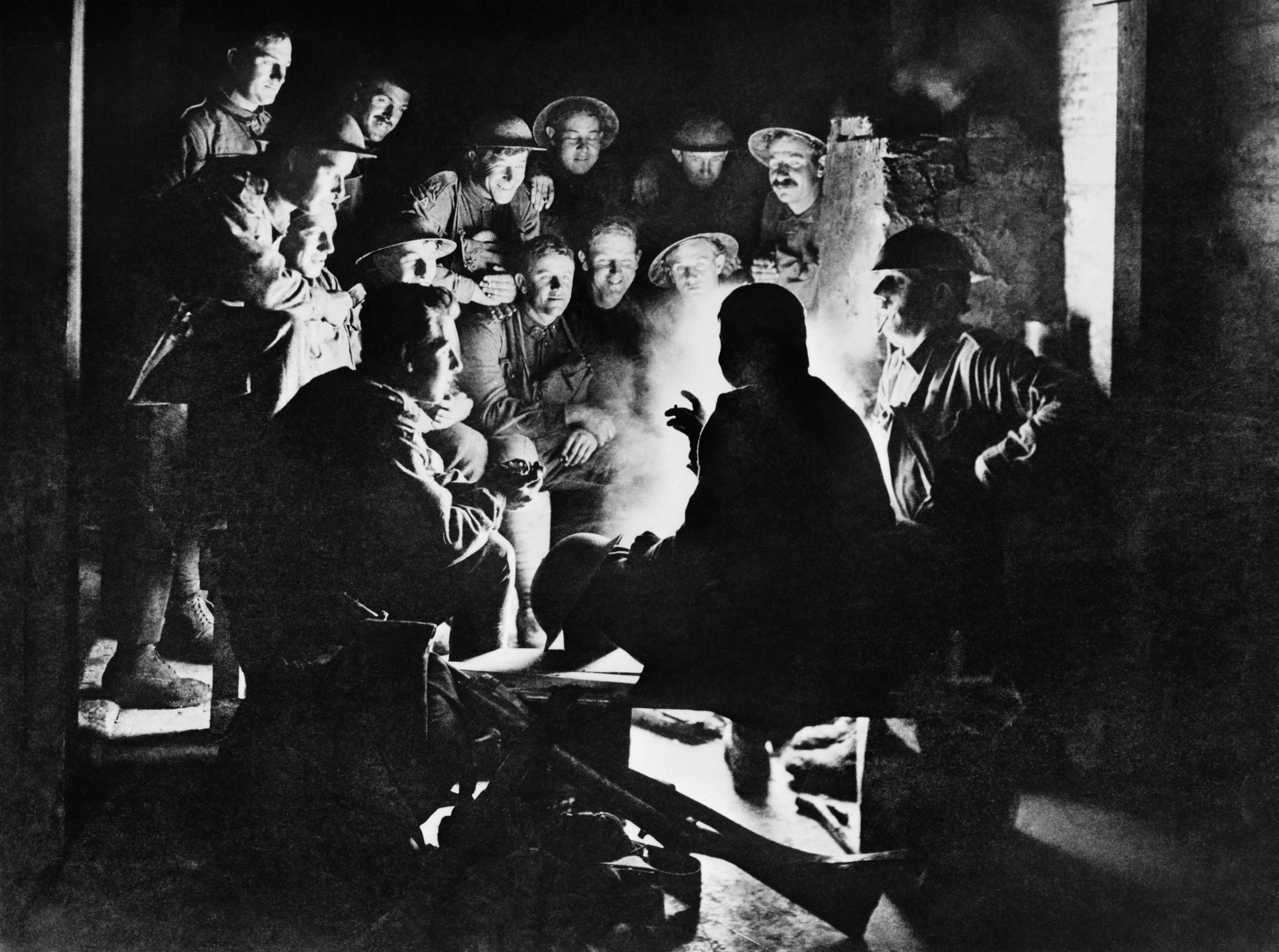
Australian infantrymen around a fire, listening to a story, November 1917

Modern storytelling has a broad purview. In addition to its traditional forms (fairytales, folktales, mythology, legends, fables etc.), it has extended itself to representing history, personal narrative, political commentary and evolving cultural norms. Contemporary storytelling is also widely used to address educational objectives. New forms of media are creating new ways for people to record, express and consume stories. Tools for asynchronous group communication can provide an environment for individuals to reframe or recast individual stories into group stories. Games and other digital platforms, such as those used in interactive fiction or interactive storytelling, may be used to position the user as a character within a bigger world. Documentaries, including interactive web documentaries, employ storytelling narrative techniques to communicate information about their topic. Self-revelatory stories, created for their cathartic and therapeutic effect, are growing in their use and application, as in psychodrama, drama therapy and playback theatre. Storytelling is also used as a means by which to precipitate psychological and social change in the practice of transformative arts.

Some people also make a case for different narrative forms being classified as storytelling in the contemporary world. For example, digital storytelling, online and dice-and-paper-based role-playing games. In traditional role-playing games, storytelling is done by the person who controls the environment and the non-playing fictional characters, and moves the story elements along for the players as they interact with the storyteller. The game is advanced by mainly verbal interactions, with a dice roll determining random events in the fictional universe, where the players interact with each other and the storyteller. This type of game has many genres, such as sci-fi and fantasy, as well as alternate-reality worlds based on the current reality, but with different settings and beings such as werewolves, aliens, daemons, or hidden societies. These oral-based role-playing games were very popular in the 1990s among circles of youth in many countries before computer and console-based online MMORPG's took their place. Despite the prevalence of computer-based MMORPGs, the dice-and-paper RPG still has a dedicated following.

== Oral traditions ==
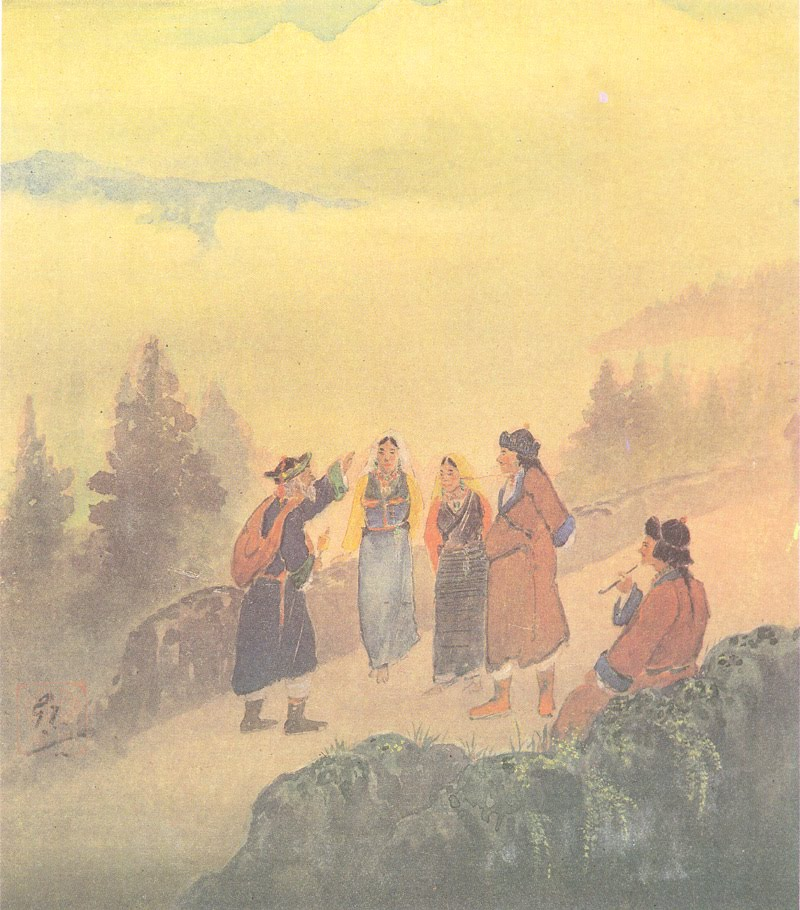
Story Teller by Gaganendranath Tagore

Oral traditions of storytelling are found in several civilizations; they predate the printed and online press. Storytelling was used to explain natural phenomena, bards told stories of creation and developed a pantheon of gods and myths. Oral stories passed from one generation to the next and storytellers were regarded as healers, leaders, spiritual guides, teachers, cultural secrets keepers and entertainers. Oral storytelling came in various forms including songs, poetry, chants and dance.

Albert Bates Lord examined oral narratives from field transcripts of Yugoslav oral bards collected by Milman Parry in the 1930s, and the texts of epics such as the Odyssey. Lord found that a large part of the stories consisted of text which was improvised during the telling process.

Lord identified two types of story vocabulary. The first he called "formulas": "Rosy-fingered Dawn", "Wine-dark Sea" and other specific set phrases had long been known of in Homer and other oral epics. Lord, however, discovered that across many story traditions, fully 90% of an oral epic is assembled from lines which are repeated verbatim or which use one-for-one word substitutions. In other words, oral stories are built out of set phrases which have been stockpiled from a lifetime of hearing and telling stories.

The other type of story vocabulary is theme, a set sequence of story actions that structure a tale. Just as the teller of tales proceeds line-by-line using formulas, so he proceeds from event-to-event using themes. One near-universal theme is repetition, as evidenced in Western folklore with the "rule of three": Three brothers set out, three attempts are made, three riddles are asked. A theme can be as simple as a specific set sequence describing the arming of a hero, starting with shirt and trousers and ending with headdress and weapons. A theme can be large enough to be a plot component. For example: a hero proposes a journey to a dangerous place / he disguises himself / his disguise fools everybody / except for a common person of little account (a crone, a tavern maid or a woodcutter) / who immediately recognizes him / the commoner becomes the hero's ally, showing unexpected resources of skill or initiative. A theme does not belong to a specific story, but may be found with minor variation in many different stories.

The story was described by Reynolds Price, when he wrote:

A need to tell and hear stories is essential to the species Homo sapiens – second in necessity apparently after nourishment and before love and shelter. Millions survive without love or home, almost none in silence; the opposite of silence leads quickly to narrative, and the sound of story is the dominant sound of our lives, from the small accounts of our day's events to the vast incommunicable constructs of psychopaths.

In contemporary life, people will seek to fill "story vacuums" with oral and written stories. "In the absence of a narrative, especially in an ambiguous and/or urgent situation, people will seek out and consume plausible stories like water in the desert. It is our innate nature to connect the dots. Once an explanatory narrative is adopted, it's extremely hard to undo," whether or not it is true.

=== Joseph Campbell ===
In the mid-20th century, Joseph Campbell, studied many cultures around the world and discovered that structurally similar narrative patterns are present in oral myths across globally disparate cultures. In his book the "Hero's Journey," he argued that oral storytelling serves as a way to transmit universal human archetypes and cultural values across generations in the absence of written records. Rather than viewing oral tales as primitive historical artefacts, Campbell's framework treats the spoken story as a practical tool designed to guide individuals through major life transitions.

=== Märchen and Sagen ===
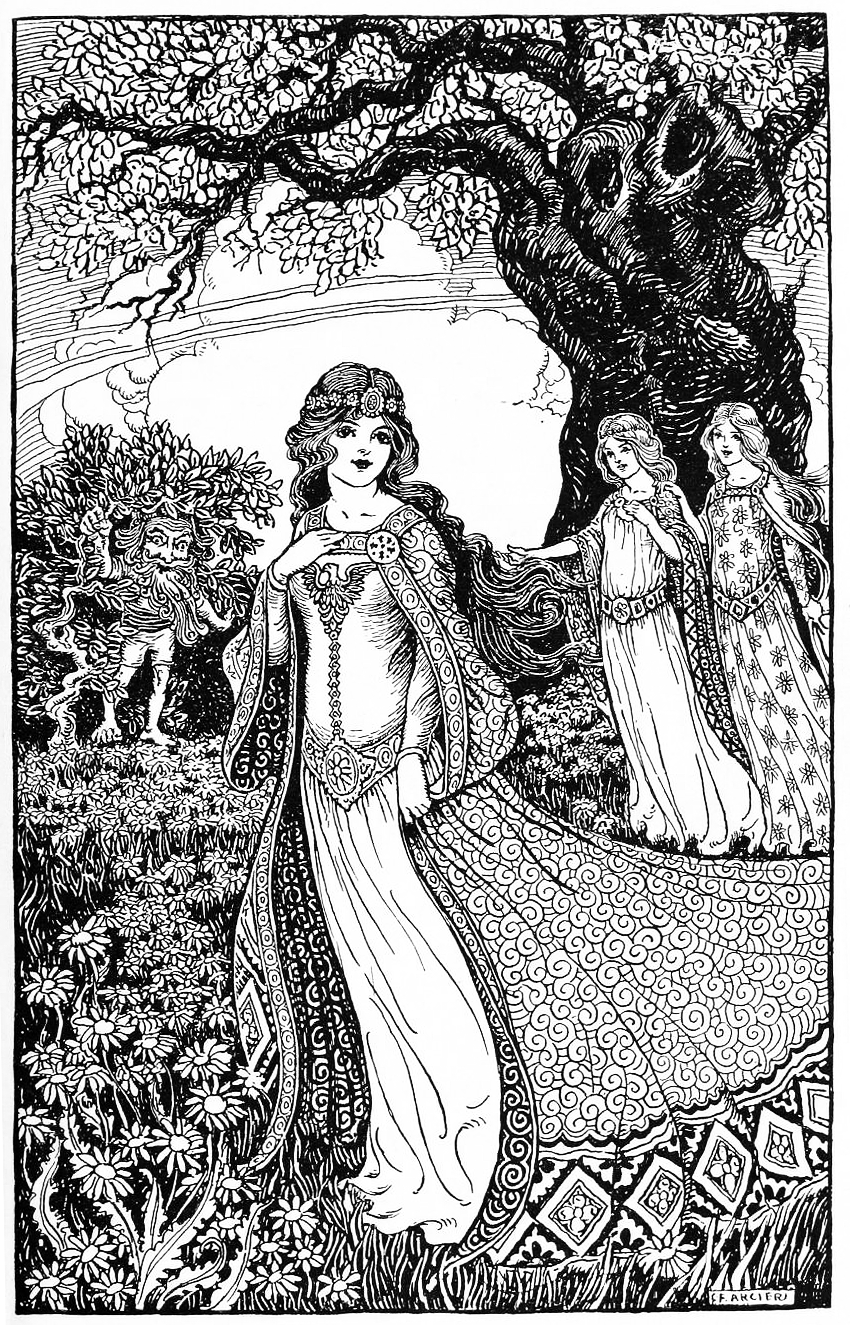
Illustration from Silesian Folk Tales (The Book of Rubezahl)

Folklorists sometimes divide oral tales into two main groups: Märchen and Sagen. These are German terms for which there are no exact English equivalents, however we have approximations:

Märchen, loosely translated as "fairy tale(s)" or little stories, take place in a kind of separate "once-upon-a-time" world of nowhere-in-particular, at an indeterminate time in the past. They are clearly not intended to be understood as true. The stories are full of clearly defined incidents, and peopled by rather flat characters with little or no interior life. When the supernatural occurs, it is presented matter-of-factly, without surprise.

Sagen (translated as "legends") are traditionally understood within folkloristics as narratives grounded in real or believed-to-be-real events, typically anchored to a specific historical time and geographical location. Unlike traditional fairy tales (Märchen), where the fantastical is accepted without surprise, legends draw narrative tension from the emotional friction generated when the uncanny or supernatural intrudes into ordinary human reality. Common narrative subgenres within this category include ghost lore, Lover's Leap traditions, encounters with supernatural entities, and contemporary UFO abduction narratives.

Another important examination of orality in human life is Walter J. Ong's Orality and Literacy: The Technologizing of the Word (1982). Ong studies the distinguishing characteristics of oral traditions, how oral and written cultures interact and condition one another, and how they ultimately influence human epistemology.

== Learning ==
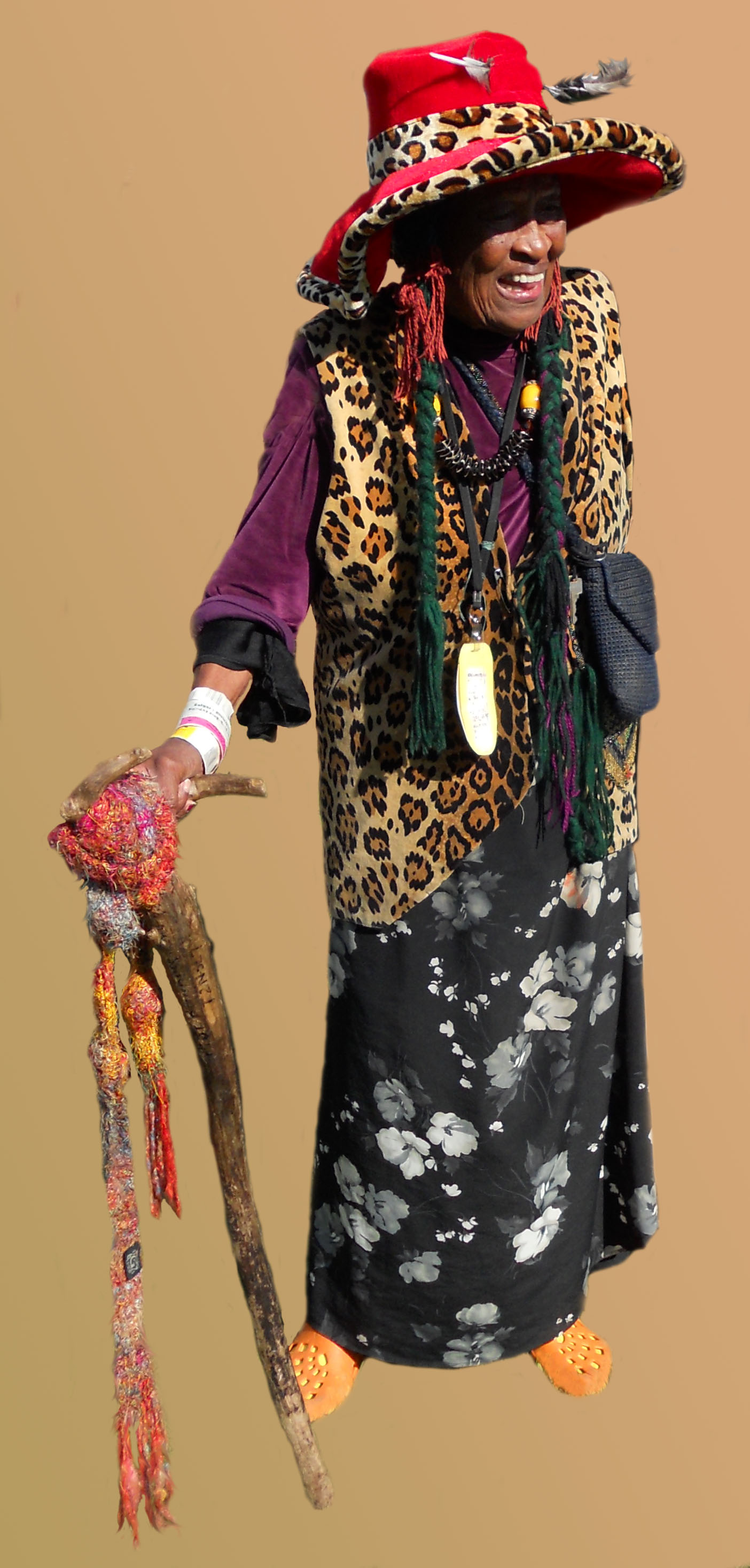
Orunamamu storyteller, griot with cane

Storytelling is a means for sharing and interpreting experiences. Peter L. Berger says human life is narratively rooted, humans construct their lives and shape their world into homes in terms of these groundings and memories. Stories are universal in that they can bridge cultural, linguistic and age-related divides. Storytelling can be adaptive for all ages, leaving out the notion of age segregation. Storytelling can be used as a method to teach ethics, values and cultural norms and differences. Learning is most effective when it takes place in social environments that provide authentic social cues about how knowledge is to be applied. Stories function as a tool to pass on knowledge in a social context. So, every story has 3 parts. First, The setup (The Hero's world before the adventure starts). Second, The Confrontation (The hero's world turned upside down). Third, The Resolution (Hero conquers villain, but it is not enough for Hero to survive. The Hero or World must be transformed). Any story can be framed in such format.

Human knowledge is based on stories and the human brain consists of cognitive machinery necessary to understand, remember and tell stories. Humans are storytelling organisms that both individually and socially, lead storied lives. Stories mirror human thought as humans think in narrative structures and most often remember facts in story form. Facts can be understood as smaller versions of a larger story, thus storytelling can supplement analytical thinking. Because storytelling requires auditory and visual senses from listeners, one can learn to organize their mental representation of a story, recognize structure of language and express their thoughts.

Stories tend to be based on experiential learning, but learning from an experience is not automatic. Often a person needs to attempt to tell the story of that experience before realizing its value. In this case, it is not only the listener who learns, but the teller who also becomes aware of their own unique experiences and background. This process of storytelling is empowering as the teller effectively conveys ideas and, with practice, is able to demonstrate the potential of human accomplishment. Storytelling taps into existing knowledge and creates bridges both culturally and motivationally toward a solution.

Stories are effective educational tools because listeners become engaged and therefore remember. Storytelling can be seen as a foundation for learning and teaching. While the story listener is engaged, they are able to imagine new perspectives, inviting a transformative and empathetic experience. This involves allowing the individual to actively engage in the story as well as observe, listen and participate with minimal guidance. Listening to a storyteller can create lasting personal connections, promote innovative problem solving and foster a shared understanding regarding future ambitions. The listener can then activate knowledge and imagine new possibilities. Together a storyteller and listener can seek best practices and invent new solutions. Because stories often have multiple layers of meanings, listeners have to listen closely to identify the underlying knowledge in the story. Storytelling is used as a tool to teach children the importance of respect through the practice of listening. As well as connecting children with their environment, through the theme of the stories, and give them more autonomy by using repetitive statements, which improve their learning to learn competence. It is also used to teach children to have respect for all life, value inter-connectedness and always work to overcome adversity. To teach this a Kinesthetic learning style would be used, involving the listeners through music, dream interpretation, or dance.

=== In indigenous cultures ===
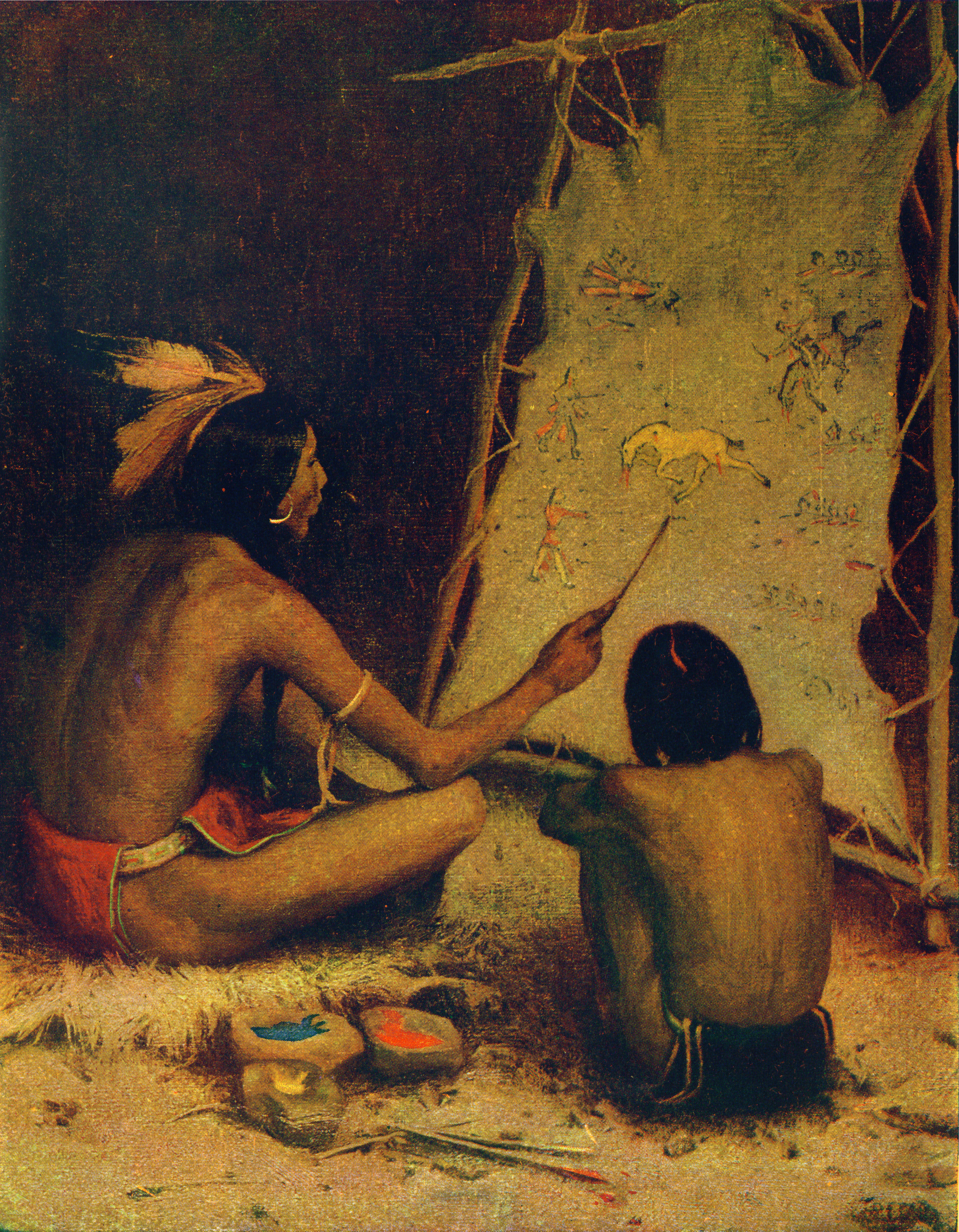
The Historian – An indigenous artist is painting in sign language, on buckskin, the story of a battle with American soldiers.

For indigenous cultures of the Americas, storytelling is used as an oral form of language associated with practices and values essential to developing one's identity. This is because everyone in the community can add their own touch and perspective to the narrative collaboratively – both individual and culturally shared perspectives have a place in the co-creation of the story. Oral storytelling in indigenous communities differs from other forms of stories because they are told not only for entertainment, but for teaching values. For example, the Sto:lo community in Canada focuses on reinforcing children's identity by telling stories about the land to explain their roles.

Furthermore, Storytelling is a way to teach younger members of indigenous communities about their culture and their identities. In Donna Eder's study, Navajos were interviewed about storytelling practices that they have had in the past and what changes they want to see in the future. They notice that storytelling makes an impact on the lives of the children of the Navajos. According to some of the Navajos that were interviewed, storytelling is one of many main practices that teaches children the important principles to live a good life. In indigenous communities, stories are a way to pass knowledge on from generation to generation.

For some indigenous people, experience has no separation between the physical world and the spiritual world. Thus, some indigenous people communicate to their children through ritual, storytelling, or dialogue. Community values, learned through storytelling, help to guide future generations and aid in identity formation.

In the Quechua community of Highland Peru, there is no separation between adults and children. This allows for children to learn storytelling through their own interpretations of the given story. Therefore, children in the Quechua community are encouraged to listen to the story that is being told in order to learn about their identity and culture. Sometimes, children are expected to sit quietly and listen actively. This enables them to engage in activities as independent learners.

This teaching practice of storytelling allowed children to formulate ideas based on their own experiences and perspectives. In Navajo communities, for children and adults, storytelling is one of the many effective ways to educate both the young and old about their cultures, identities and history. Storytelling help the Navajos know who they are, where they come from and where they belong.

Storytelling in indigenous cultures is sometimes passed on by oral means in a quiet and relaxing environment, which usually coincides with family or tribal community gatherings and official events such as family occasions, rituals, or ceremonial practices. During the telling of the story, children may act as participants by asking questions, acting out the story, or telling smaller parts of the story. Furthermore, stories are not often told in the same manner twice, resulting in many variations of a single myth. This is because narrators may choose to insert new elements into old stories dependent upon the relationship between the storyteller and the audience, making the story correspond to each unique situation.

Indigenous cultures also use instructional ribbing— a playful form of correcting children's undesirable behavior— in their stories. For example, the Ojibwe (or Chippewa) tribe uses the tale of an owl snatching away misbehaving children. The caregiver will often say, "The owl will come and stick you in his ears if you don't stop crying!" Thus, this form of teasing serves as a tool to correct inappropriate behavior and promote cooperation.

Storytelling is a way to archive cultural knowledge and values within indigenous American communities. Research on the Metis (an Indigenous nation in Canada) shows that the communal atmosphere during storytelling events functions as "witnessing" a storyteller which allows the story to become a "ceremonial landscape", or shared reference, for everyone present. By pausing their day-to-day activities to engage with stories, the Metis cemented the shared reference of popular stories and folklore to pass down vital knowledge to younger generations.

==== Types ====
There are various types of stories among many indigenous communities. Communication in Indigenous American communities is rich with stories, myths, philosophies and narratives that serve as a means to exchange information. These stories may be used for coming of age themes, core values, morality, literacy and history. Very often, the stories are used to instruct and teach children about cultural values and lessons. The meaning within the stories is not always explicit, and children are expected to make their own meaning of the stories. In the Lakota Tribe of North America, for example, young girls are often told the story of the White Buffalo Calf Woman, who is a spiritual figure that protects young girls from the whims of men. In the Odawa Tribe, young boys are often told the story of a young man who never took care of his body, and as a result, his feet fail to run when he tries to escape predators. This story serves as an indirect means of encouraging the young boys to take care of their bodies.

Narratives can be shared to express the values or morals among family, relatives, or people who are considered part of the close-knit community. Many stories in indigenous American communities all have a "surface" story, that entails knowing certain information and clues to unlocking the metaphors in the story. The underlying message of the story being told, can be understood and interpreted with clues that hint to a certain interpretation. In order to make meaning from these stories, elders in the Sto:lo community for example, emphasize the importance in learning how to listen, since it requires the senses to bring one's heart and mind together. For instance, a way in which children learn about the metaphors significant for the society they live in, is by listening to their elders and participating in rituals where they respect one another.

==== Passing on values ====
Stories in indigenous cultures encompass a variety of values. These values include an emphasis on individual responsibility, concern for the environment and communal welfare.

Stories are based on values passed down by older generations to shape the foundation of the community. Storytelling is used as a bridge for knowledge and understanding allowing the values of "self" and "community" to connect and be learned as a whole. Storytelling in the Navajo community for example allows for community values to be learned at different times and places for different learners. Stories are told from the perspective of other people, animals, or the natural elements of the earth. In this way, children learn to value their place in the world as a person in relation to others. Typically, stories are used as an informal learning tool in Indigenous American communities, and can act as an alternative method for reprimanding children's bad behavior. In this way, stories are non-confrontational, which allows the child to discover for themselves what they did wrong and what they can do to adjust the behavior.

Parents in the Arizona Tewa community, for example, teach morals to their children through traditional narratives. Lessons focus on several topics including historical or "sacred" stories or more domestic disputes. Through storytelling, the Tewa community emphasizes the traditional wisdom of the ancestors and the importance of collective as well as individual identities. Indigenous communities teach children valuable skills and morals through the actions of good or mischievous stock characters while also allowing room for children to make meaning for themselves. By not being given every element of the story, children rely on their own experiences and not formal teaching from adults to fill in the gaps.

When children listen to stories, they periodically vocalize their ongoing attention and accept the extended turn of the storyteller. The emphasis on attentiveness to surrounding events and the importance of oral tradition in indigenous communities teaches children the skill of keen attention. For example, children of the Tohono O'odham people who engaged in more cultural practices were able to recall the events in a verbally presented story better than those who did not engage in cultural practices. Body movements and gestures help to communicate values and keep stories alive for future generations. Elders, parents and grandparents are typically involved in teaching the children the cultural ways, along with history, community values and teachings of the land.

Children in indigenous communities can also learn from the underlying message of a story. For example, in a nahuatl community near Mexico City, stories about ahuaques or hostile water dwelling spirits that guard over the bodies of water, contain morals about respecting the environment. If the protagonist of a story, who has accidentally broken something that belongs to the ahuaque, does not replace it or give back in some way to the ahuaque, the protagonist dies. In this way, storytelling serves as a way to teach what the community values, such as valuing the environment.

Storytelling also serves to deliver a particular message during spiritual and ceremonial functions. In the ceremonial use of storytelling, the unity building theme of the message becomes more important than the time, place and characters of the message. Once the message is delivered, the story is finished. As cycles of the tale are told and retold, story units can recombine, showing various outcomes for a person's actions.

==== Passing on Survival Strategies ====
Stories can be used to pass on survival strategies across generations, and have particular utility in providing warnings for rare events. This is one of the oldest and most universal means of transmitting information in human societies.

As an example, the 2004 Indian Ocean earthquake triggered a series of deadly tsunamis that devastated coastal communities and killed more than 200,000 people. But of the 78,000 people living on the island of Simeulue, located less than 25 miles from the epicentre, only seven people died. Residents had been taught tsunami survival skills by embedding them in lullabies and stories that they had learned as children and retold as adults. When the ocean quickly receded in the aftermath of the earthquake, such stories may have provided both a warning and a plan of action to help guide residents to safety on higher ground.

== Stories as instruments of power ==
Some approaches treat narratives as politically motivated stories, stories empowering certain groups and stories giving people agency. Instead of just searching for the main point of the narrative, the political function is demanded through asking, "Whose interest does a personal narrative serve"? This approach mainly looks at the power, authority, knowledge, ideology and identity; "whether it legitimates and dominates or resists and empowers". All personal narratives are seen as ideological because they evolve from a structure of power relations and simultaneously produce, maintain and reproduce that power structure".

Political theorist, Hannah Arendt argues that storytelling transforms private meaning to public meaning. Regardless of the gender of the narrator and what story they are sharing, the performance of the narrative and the audience listening to it is where the power lies.

Storytelling is tool that archaeologists are beginning to employ to explore marginalised lives in the past. This 'storytelling as method' enriches archaeological narratives and can be used as a corrective to the understanding of the past, ensuring that archaeology is meaningful, matters, and has social justice at its heart .

== Therapeutic ==
Therapeutic storytelling is the act of telling one's story in an attempt to better understand oneself or one's situation. Oftentimes, these stories affect the audience in a therapeutic sense as well, helping them to view situations similar to their own through a different lens. Noted author and folklore scholar, Elaine Lawless states, "...this process provides new avenues for understanding and identity formation. Language is utilised to bear witness to their lives". Sometimes a narrator will simply skip over certain details without realizing, only to include it in their stories during a later telling. In this way, that telling and retelling of the narrative serves to "reattach portions of the narrative". These gaps may occur due to a repression of the trauma or even just a want to keep the most gruesome details private. Regardless, these silences are not as empty as they appear, and it is only this act of storytelling that can enable the teller to fill them back in.

Psychodrama uses re-enactment of a personal, traumatic event in the life of a psychodrama group participant as a therapeutic methodology, first developed by psychiatrist, J.L. Moreno, M.D. This therapeutic use of storytelling was incorporated into Drama Therapy, known in the field as "Self Revelatory Theater". In 1975 Jonathan Fox and Jo Salas developed a therapeutic, improvisational storytelling form they called Playback Theatre. Therapeutic storytelling is also used to promote healing through transformative arts, where a facilitator helps a participant write and often present their personal story to an audience.

== As art form ==
=== Aesthetics ===
The art of narrative is, by definition, an aesthetic enterprise, and there are a number of artistic elements that typically interact in well-developed stories. Such elements include the essential idea of narrative structure with identifiable beginnings, middles, and endings, or exposition-development-climax-resolution-denouement, normally constructed into coherent plot lines; a strong focus on temporality, which includes retention of the past, attention to present action and protention/future anticipation; a substantial focus on characters and characterization which is "arguably the most important single component of the novel"; a given heterogloss of different voices dialogically at play ("the sound of the human voice, or many voices, speaking in a variety of accents, rhythms and registers"); possesses a narrator or narrator-like voice, which by definition "addresses" and "interacts with" reading audiences (see Reader Response theory); communicates with a Wayne Booth-esque rhetorical thrust, a dialectic process of interpretation, which is at times beneath the surface, conditioning a plotted narrative, and at other times much more visible, "arguing" for and against various positions; relies substantially on now-standard aesthetic figuration, particularly including the use of metaphor, metonymy, synecdoche and irony (see Hayden White, Metahistory for expansion of this idea); is often enmeshed in intertextuality, with copious connections, references, allusions, similarities, parallels, etc. to other literatures; and commonly demonstrates an effort toward bildungsroman, a description of identity development with an effort to evince becoming in character and community.

=== Festivals ===
Storytelling festivals typically feature the work of several storytellers and may include workshops for tellers and others who are interested in the art form or other targeted applications of storytelling. Elements of the oral storytelling art form often include the tellers encouragement to have participants co-create an experience by connecting to relatable elements of the story and using techniques of visualization (the seeing of images in the mind's eye), and use vocal and bodily gestures to support understanding. In many ways, the art of storytelling draws upon other art forms such as acting, oral interpretation and Performance Studies.

In 1903, Richard Wyche, a professor of literature at the University of Tennessee, and his students established the National Story Tellers' League at the Summer School of the South. It was called "The National Story League". Wyche served as its president for 16 years, facilitated storytelling classes, and spurred an interest in the art.

Several other storytelling organizations started in the United States during the 1970s. One such organization was the National Association for the Perpetuation and Preservation of Storytelling (NAPPS), now the National Storytelling Network (NSN) and the International Storytelling Center (ISC). NSN is a professional organization that helps to organize resources for tellers and festival planners. The ISC runs the National Storytelling Festival in Jonesborough, Tennessee. Australia followed their American counterparts with the establishment of storytelling guilds in the late 1970s. Australian storytelling today has individuals and groups across the country who meet to share their stories. The UK's Society for Storytelling was founded in 1993, bringing together tellers and listeners, and each year since 2000 has run a National Storytelling Week the first week of February.

Currently, there are dozens of storytelling festivals and hundreds of professional storytellers around the world, and an international celebration of the art occurs on World Storytelling Day.

== The shift from oral traditions to written authorship ==
In oral traditions, stories are kept alive by being told again and again. The material of any given story naturally undergoes several changes and adaptations during this process. When and where oral tradition was superseded by writing, the literary idea of the author as originator of a story's authoritative version changed people's perception of stories themselves. In centuries following, stories tended to be seen as the work of individuals rather than a collective effort.

For example, The stories of the Iliad and Odyssey were told for hundreds of years by many narrators, but when Homer was assigned as the author, people's perception of the creative act changed. The original nameless creators were forgotten. The same happened with the Brothers Grimm, who collected local folklore and codified them under their own brand : Grimm's Fairy Tales.

Only recently when a significant number of influential authors began questioning their own roles, the value of stories as such – independent of authorship – was again recognized. Literary critics such as Roland Barthes even proclaimed the Death of the Author.

== In business ==
People have been telling stories at work since ancient times, when stories might inspire "courage and empowerment during the hunt for a potentially dangerous animal," or simply instill the value of listening. Storytelling in business has become a field in its own right as industries have grown, as storytelling becomes a more popular art form in general through live storytelling events like The Moth.

=== Recruiting ===
Storytelling has come to have a prominent role in recruiting. The modern recruiting industry started in the 1940s as employers competed for available labor during World War II. Prior to that, employers usually placed newspaper ads telling a story about the kind of person they wanted, including their character and, in many cases, their ethnicity.

=== Public relations ===
Public influence has been part of human civilization since ancient times, but the modern public relations industry traces its roots to a Boston-based PR firm called "The Publicity Bureau" that opened in 1900. Although a PR firm may not identify its role as storytelling, the firm's task is to control the public narrative about the organization they represent.

=== Networking ===
Networking has been around since the industrial revolution when businesses recognized the need—and the benefit—of collaborating and trusting a wider range of people. Today, networking is the subject for more than 100,000 books, seminars and online conversations.

Storytelling helps networkers showcase their expertise. "Using examples and stories to teach contacts about expertise, experience, talents, and interests" is one of eight networking competencies the Association for Talent Development has identified, saying that networkers should "be able to answer the question, 'What do you do?' to make expertise visible and memorable." Business storytelling begins by considering the needs of the audience the networker wishes to reach, asking, "What is it about what I do that my audience is most interested in?" and "What would intrigue them the most?"

=== Within the workplace ===
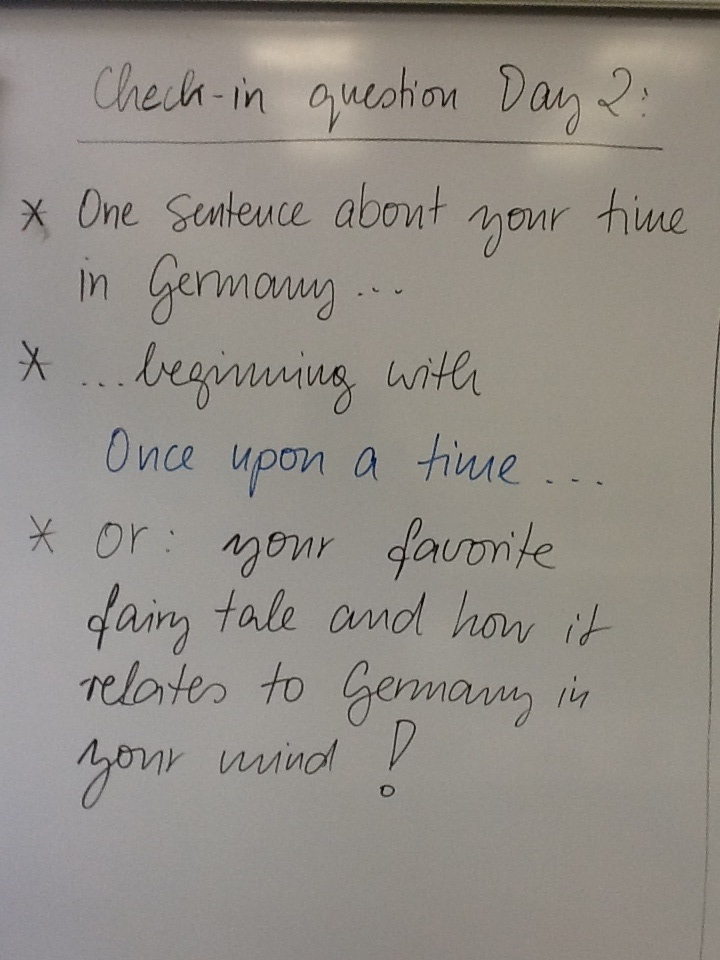
Example of the use of storytelling in education

In the workplace, communicating by using storytelling techniques can be a more compelling and effective route of delivering information than that of using only dry facts. Uses include:

==== To manage conflicts ====
For managers storytelling is an important way of resolving conflicts, addressing issues and facing challenges. Managers may use narrative discourse to deal with conflicts when direct action is inadvisable or impossible.

==== To interpret the past and shape the future ====
In a group discussion a process of collective narration can help to influence others and unify the group by linking the past to the future. In such discussions, managers transform problems, requests and issues into stories. Jameson calls this collective group construction story building.

==== In the reasoning process ====
Storytelling plays an important role in reasoning processes and in convincing others. In business meetings, managers and business officials preferred stories to abstract arguments or statistical measures. When situations are complex or dense, narrative discourse helps to resolve conflicts, influences corporate decisions and stabilizes the group.

=== In marketing ===
Storytelling is increasingly being used in advertising in order to build customer loyalty. According to Giles Lury, this marketing trend echoes the deeply rooted human need to be entertained. Stories are illustrative, easily memorable and allow companies to create stronger emotional bonds with customers.

A Nielsen study shows consumers want a more personal connection in the way they gather information since human brains are more engaged by storytelling than by the presentation of facts alone. When reading pure data, only the language parts of the brain work to decode the meaning. But when reading a story, both the language parts and those parts of the brain that would be engaged if the events of the story were actually experienced are activated. As a result, it is easier to remember stories than facts.

Marketing developments incorporating storytelling include the use of the trans-media techniques that originated in the film industry intended to "build a world in which your story can evolve". Examples include the "Happiness Factory" of Coca-Cola.

== See also ==
- Dastangoi
- Dramatic structure
- Just war doctrine
- Story arc
- Storyboard
- Storytelling festival
- Storytelling game
- World Storytelling Day
