= Franciscan missions =

Franciscan missions may refer to the following:

- Franciscan missions to the Maya
- Franciscan Missions in the Sierra Gorda of Querétaro
- Spanish missions in California, operated by the Franciscans in Alta California
- Spanish missions in New Mexico
