= Child work in Indigenous American cultures =

Child work in Indigenous American cultures covers the physical and mental contributions by children towards achieving a personal or communal goal in Indigenous American societies. As a form of prosocial behavior, children's work is often a vital contribution towards community productivity and typically involves non-exploitative motivations for children's engagement in work activities. Activities can range from domestic household chores to participation in family and community endeavors. German anthropologist Inge Bolin notes that children's work can blur the boundaries between learning, play, and work in a form of productive interaction between children and adults. Such activities do not have to be mutually exclusive.

== Among indigenous American communities ==
Children's work is a valued means of learning and child-rearing in many Indigenous American communities. It is seen as eagerly contributing in a collaborative and flexible environment, aimed at the children learning consideration, responsibility and skills with the guidance and support of adults. Indigenous American children are motivated to participate in the community because of cultural values: for example, everyone does something to participate and wants to be an equal member of society. The children do not see it as working, but as helping, because they feel responsible for what happens within their communities. As demonstrated by a Mexican Nahua community, children are encouraged to begin child work at the age of two for about 6 to 7 hours a day. They do not need to be convinced to help, but want to be involved in the activity. Child work can be household help, taking care of family members, or helping in community endeavors.

Indigenous American children learn functional life skills through real-time observation of adults and interactive participation of these learned skills within the community. Active contributions to family and community work directly affects children's cognitive maturity by allowing children agency over their own development. This maturity at a younger age allows children to perform higher-skilled tasks. Younger children have shown initiative by helping strangers to make them feel like a part of the community, by which children offer to help strangers or treat them like family. This maturity comes from the community fully incorporating children at a young age and allowing them to participate in everyday tasks. The community trusts their children and treats them as equals, so the children want to engage in the community as much as they can. Parents trust their children to translate and negotiate bills with people, when the parents cannot speak the language.

The maturity that Indigenous American children develop is demonstrated in Zinacantec Mayan communities, where children learn complex motor skills and techniques for weaving through keen observation of working adults and by executing the skills themselves. In Peru, young Chillihuani boys learn how to build shelters and homes by actively assisting adults during the building process by moving and placing appropriately sized stones. Ethnographic studies show that Indigenous American children learn intently through keen observation in activities by other children.

Children's work is also attributed to learning cultural values in addition to individual personality development. Many Indigenous children in Peru develop a sense of responsibility by participating in work often motivated by an internal and external drive to be an active participant in the community. Paradise & De Haan refer to this process as practicing responsibility and reciprocity through role-taking as an observing helper or active performer. Through participation in work, most children in Indigenous American communities identify as cooperative members of a community through first-hand exposure to the direct impact of their action or inaction in community responsibilities. In Guatemalan Mayan communities, children are often expected to take part in these practices. When schools became prevalent, children who were not seen as providing valuable contributions to family and community endeavors may only then be sent away to school to make use of their time.

Some Indigenous communities are skeptical of sending their children to western schools, because their children lose the initiative to help their families and are not as motivated. Western schooling is a different way of teaching than indigenous communities teach their children. However, children that go through western schooling learn English and end up translating for their families, which is another way of helping them or another way of learning. The children perfect their language skills, as well as their social skills because they interact with many types of people by translating for their families.

=== Learning by observing and pitching in ===
The initiative that Indigenous children demonstrate is part of the process of Learning by Observing and Pitching In. LOPI is a six faceted process of learning commonly used by Indigenous American cultures. Also known by "Intent Community Participation," it fully immerses a child into the community and allows them to learn, through observation and participation, as they help within their family as well as within their community. Children learn through their work, which is a cultural tradition among indigenous people. Child work is a social experience that allows a child to gain a sense of responsibility and build ties among the community. LOPI is distinctly different from traditional forms of Western learning. Instead of focusing on "formal" or instructional learning in school settings which typically place emphasis on children's motivation and attention capabilities, LOPI engages with their everyday lives. As it seems, the way in which society decides to teach children falls on either end of the spectrum (LOPI or Westernization ways) rather than on the basis of a continuum. LOPI, as stated above, places high emphasis on integration of children in the endeavors of their families and community. The six faceted process of learning can be summarized as follows: community organization of learning, motive, social organization of endeavors, goal of learning, learning according to means, and communication. An important aspect of the LOPI model is the in-depth ethnographic and biological observations as well as comparative studies that were used to generate the facets about Indigenous American communities. It is necessary to take into consideration the model of LOPI as a coherent system as each facet plays a role in relation to the next. It is also possible to compare LOPI to Assembly-Line Instruction which aims to control the learner's attention, motivation, and behavior in the community. This approach was originally founded due to the influx of new students as a result of immigration. In this approach, school and activities related to family and community are segregated. There are large contrasting differences in the collaborative guidance and the control of the learner's attention and behavior between LOPI and Assembly-Line Instruction. As learning works, there are several different approaches one can take and culture and generational differences have influential effects. Most real life situations will not strictly adhere to either of these models. The original intent of LOPI was to study cultural differences in learning across nations rather than to make assumptions based on race, ethnicity, or national origins.

== International Labour Organization recognition of child work vs. child labour ==
The International Labour Organization recognizes the importance of child work in various cultures. In most Indigenous communities, work is a source of pride for both adults and children. Because of different cultural views involving labor, the International Labour Organization (ILO) developed a series of culturally sensitive mandates including Conventions No. 169, 107, 138, and 182 to protect indigenous culture, traditions, and identities. Conventions No. 138 and 182 lead in the fight against child labour, while No. 107 and 169 promote the right of indigenous and tribal peoples and protect their right to define their own developmental priorities. The ILO recognizes these changes are necessary to respect the culture and traditions of other communities while also looking after the welfare of children. In many Indigenous communities, parenting includes teaching children to learn important life lessons through the act of work and through participation in daily life.

Working is seen as a learning process preparing children for the tasks they will have to do as an adult. It is a belief that the family's and child's well-being and survival is a shared responsibility between members of the whole family. They also see work as an intrinsic part of their child's developmental process. While these attitudes toward child work remain, many children and parents from indigenous communities still highly value education. ILO wants to include these communities in the fight against exploitative child labor while being sensitive to their traditions and values.
