= Franciscan missions to the Maya =

The Franciscan Missions to the Maya were the attempts of the Franciscans to Christianize the indigenous peoples of the New World, specifically the Maya. They began to take place soon after the European discovery of the New World made by Christopher Columbus in 1492, which opened the door for Catholic missions. As early as 1519 there are records of Franciscan activity in the Americas, and throughout the early 16th century the mission movement spreads from the original contact point in the Caribbean to include Mexico, Central America, parts of South America, and the Southwestern United States.

The goal of the missions was to spread the Christian faith to the people of the New World through "word and example". Their attempts, however, resulted in rebellion.

== Purpose ==
Spreading Christianity to the newly discovered continent was a top priority, but only one piece of the Spanish colonization system. The influence of the Franciscans, considering that missionaries are sometimes seen as tools of imperialism, enabled other objectives to be reached, such as the extension of Spanish language, culture and political control to the New World. A goal was to change the agricultural or nomadic Indian into a model of the Spanish people and society. Basically, the aim was for urbanization. The missions achieved this by “offering gifts and persuasion…and safety from enemies." This protection was also security for the Spanish military operation, since there would be theoretically less warring if the natives were pacified, thus working with another piece of the system.

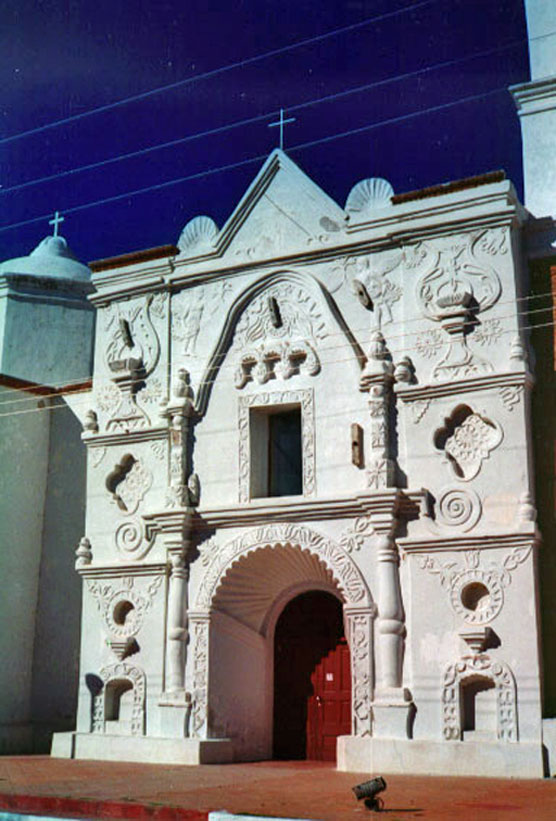
The chapel of Mission San Pedro y San Pablo del Tubutama

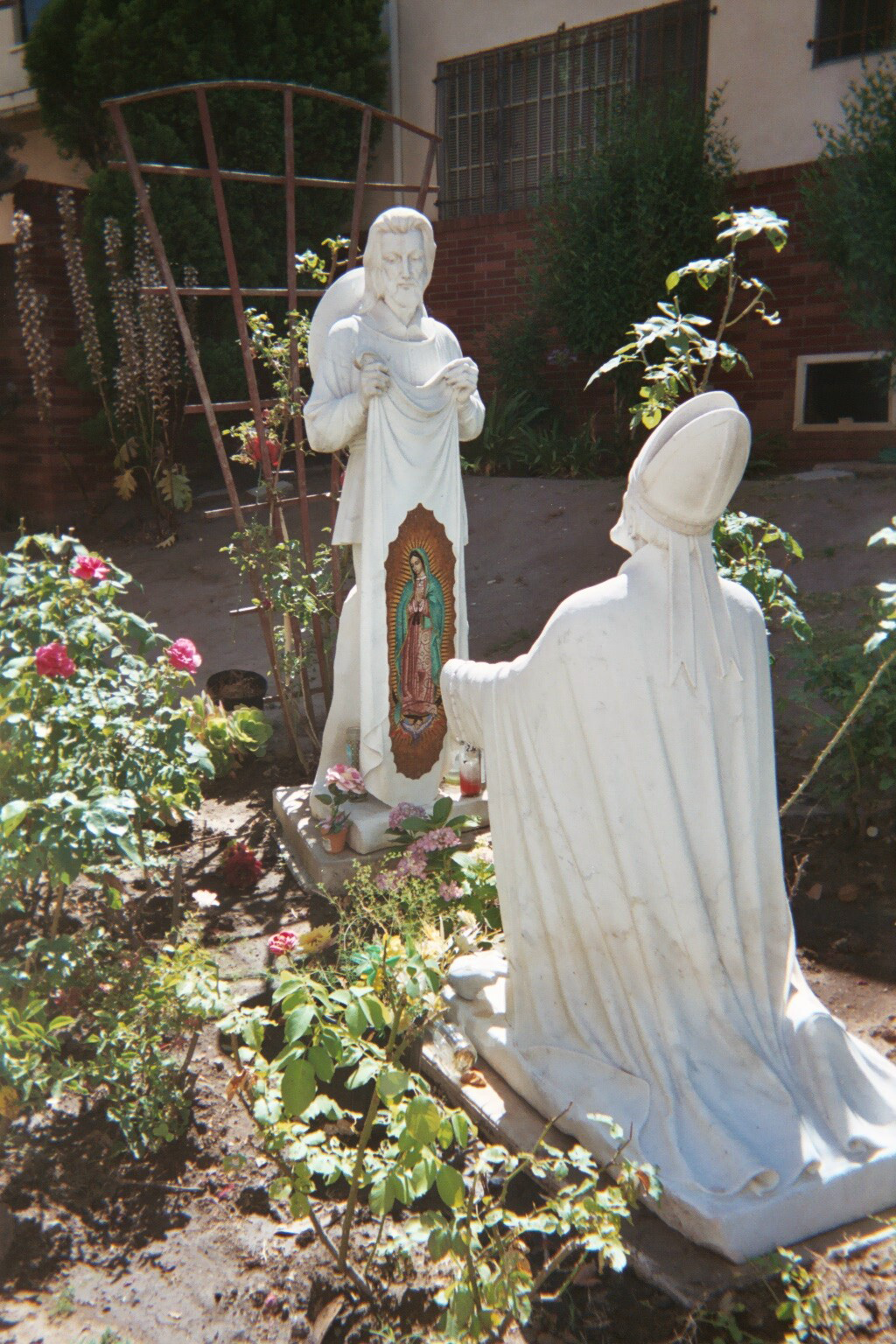
Statues of Juan Diego and Juan de Zumárraga

== Methods in Yucatan ==
Franciscan influence in the Yucatán can be considered unique because they enjoyed sole access to the area; no other religious orders, such as the Jesuits or the Dominicans were competing for the territory. Essentially, this meant that there was no one to defy the goings-on of the Franciscans at this time. They were able to use whatever method they deemed necessary to spread their beliefs, although at the beginning they tried to follow the "conversion program" that had already been used in Mexico.

== Word and example ==
The original method of instruction of the "new faith" to the Maya was very straightforward and simple. "Word and example" would be all they need to show these people. An example of how the Franciscans carried out this belief can be seen by the actions of Fray Martín de Valencia, one of the Twelve Apostles of Mexico. Upon arrival to his province, he kneeled before a group of assembled natives and began to speak publicly of his own sins [a form of confession], and commenced to whip himself in front of all. Thus the ideal method of teaching was to avoid "direct exercise of power."

== Education of youth ==
Another means of conversion was the education of the Mayan youth. Through the aforementioned conversion programme, "sons of the nobles were taken into monastery schools and there taught until they were judged sufficiently secure in the faith to be returned to their villages as Christian schoolmasters, where they were to lead their fellow villagers through simple routines of worship." According to Fray Diego de Landa in his book Relación de las cosas de Yucatán, this program was quite successful, and an “admirable thing to see."

== Physical punishment ==
The early success through peaceful teaching and quiet example of the Franciscan missionaries, however, was short lived. Within the first few years it became apparent that verbal teaching would not be enough, as the Mayans remained overall unmoved of the lessons of Christianity. In 1539 the heads of the three religious orders operating in Mexico met with the Franciscan bishop Juan de Zumárraga and concluded that the friars of the missionaries could legally inflict “light punishment” on the Mayans. These moderate disciplines, however, soon turned into cases of brutality. Certain Catholic officials spoke out against these crimes. For example, Vasco de Quiroga, a bishop of Michoacán: "[the regular orders] are now inflicting many mistreatments upon the Indians, with great haughtiness and cruelty, for when the Indians do not obey them, they insult and strike them, tear out their hair, have them stripped and cruelly flogged, and then throw them into prison in chains and cruel irons."

== Cochua and Chetumal ==
Because of extreme cruelties inflicted upon the Mayan people of the provinces Cochua and Chetumal, Quintana Roo, a rebellion broke out. The violence includes several citizens burned alive in their homes, the hanging of women from branches, with their children then hanged from their feet, and another instance of hanging virgins simply for their beauty. While de Landa does not go into details of what the Mayans did to the Spaniards, he certainly graphically explains the Spanish retribution: "the Spaniards pacified them… [by] cutting off noses, arms and legs, and the breasts of women; throwing them into deep lagoons with gourds tied to their feet; stabbing the little children because they did not walk as fast as their mothers."

== Valladolid ==
An additional rebellion was executed by the Indians of Valladolid. During this rebellion, which took place in 1546, many Spaniards were killed, as well as native converts loyal to their masters. Livestock from Spain was razed, and Spanish trees uprooted. The presence and activity of the Franciscans is believed to be the cause of this riot. In one day, seventeen Spaniards were killed, and some four hundred servants were either killed or wounded.

== Killings of Friars ==
Another form of rebellion by the Maya and other indigenous groups against the Franciscans was the murder of missionaries themselves, often just two or three at a time, though in some instances many more. Described as martyrs, these men were picked off in twos or threes throughout the years of the missionary work all through Mexico.

== Success ==
As with most if not all other indigenous groups that came in contact with the Spanish conquest in the sixteenth century, the conquests made by Spain were successful in terms of global achievement: a religious power from a small country in Europe that governed and maintained control of a vast area of land for several centuries. In history there is no equal achievement.

== See also ==
- Spanish conquest of Petén
