= Transformative arts =

Transformative arts is the use of artistic activities, such as story-telling, painting, sculpture and music-making, to precipitate constructive individual and social change.

The individual changes effected through transformative arts are commonly cognitive and emotional. This results from the way participation in a creative process and pursuit of an artistic practice can promote a critical re-evaluation of previously held beliefs, accompanied by unfamiliar feelings, which alters perception of the world, oneself, and others.

The social changes effected through transformative arts occurs when this altered perception manifests in new ways of interacting with others.

Although engagement in artistic activities has been integral to the means by which individuals and communities have sought personal comfort, self-reflection, and group cohesion for thousands of years, the origin of transformative arts as a modern formal concept is commonly attributed to the work of John Dewey.

Dewey espoused four main ideas around which transformative arts pivot. Firstly, art is not an object but an experience, in which one or more persons participate. Secondly, every individual is potentially an artist by way of his or her capacity to participate in this experience, through any artistic activity. Thirdly, such participation inevitably precipitates some kind of transformative change to how the participants think, feel, and behave. Fourthly, art is therefore both psychological and social, transforming not only individual intrapersonal processes, but also interpersonal relationships.

Accordingly, transformative arts are facilitated by artists with the psychological purpose of promoting individual introspection, and with the social purpose of promoting inclusion, reciprocity, and justice.
