= Child integration =

Inclusion of children in mature daily activities

Child integration is the inclusion of children in a variety of mature daily activities of families and communities. This contrasts with, for example, age segregation; separating children into age-defined activities and institutions (e.g., some models of organized schooling). Integrating children in the range of mature family and community activities gives equal value and responsibility to children as contributors and collaborators, and can be a way to help them learn. Children's integration provides a learning environment because children are able to observe and pitch in as they feel they can.

In the United States, child integration into "adult" life is not as common as it used to be. However, in other cultures social norms continue to incorporate children into the mature, productive activities of the family and community. In all cultures child integration is present in one way or another. For example, nearly all children's first language learning seems to be supported through integration with a mature linguistic community. Children usually are not taught in a classroom how to speak, but instead learn by observing the language and pitching it when they can.

== Examples of children in collaborative communities ==
Children in Indigenous communities participate in mature activities with the guidance from someone who has practice in that activity. When engaged in shared endeavors the guider and the learner both notice and assess how much understanding the learner has in the task and the guider provides support if it is needed.

Indigenous cultures emphasize and instill values of being respectful, empathic and cooperative to their children. These values are practiced through tasks like co-sleeping and group play which helps bring about close connections within the family and community.

There are many different ways children can be integrated into society. One example, child care educators in certain Native communities, like the First Nations in Canada have taught children traditional language, where then the children have the responsibility to spread that language knowledge by teaching their parents and other family members, thus ingratiating them into society with responsibility to carry on the language legacy.

The Chippewa people have several different methods of teaching, such as lecturing and counseling, and integrating children into adult and community life. Overall, the children do the same tasks as their mothers and fathers just on a smaller scale. For example, a young girl might learn to make nets like her mother and uses the same knots her mother uses but makes smaller nets than her mother. Throughout the years she will slowly make bigger and bigger nets and perfect the skill that her mother and her mother's mother before her had. These skills may be learned by observation and sometimes if a specific person in the community is very skillful at something, the adults might recommend the child go find that person and learn from them.

=== Community endeavors ===
The integration of children into community and family endeavors in Indigenous American Communities begins as early as infancy. Among the Mayan peoples of the Yucatan peninsula, children are allowed to roam freely allowing them ample opportunity to become acquainted with the mundane activities of the family. In the Mexican indigenous community of the Mazahua, children will coordinate their activities with those of their parents in a manner that allows them to cooperate in familial endeavors and may at times be granted a leading position in the endeavor. Children are considered to be valuable and responsible contributors of the community. The process of child integration into mature activities begins in infancy and continuous throughout time; between ages 3 and 4 the child will already be participating in some of the family's day to day activities, by ages 5 and 7 that child will already be cooperating in most of the endeavors that adults engage in and will have also earned several important responsibilities which can range from performing certain household tasks to providing childcare for younger siblings.

The cultural practice of integrating children in the mature activities of the family and community is common in many Indigenous American communities. Many integrate children into "adult" activities, work life, and other cultural practices at a very young age. Among the Quechua people of the Andes, families accept the child as a part of an integral process towards a collective wellbeing. Two-year-olds in the Chillihuani community frequently get their own food and drink, and those of herding families participate in herding and caring for the animals. In this community, work and play are not two separable things (i.e., one for adult and one for children). The children enjoy having real responsibilities and find pride in being able to contribute to their society.

Similarly, some Chippewa communities of Washington also commonly integrate children in the mature activities of the community. Children are expected to observe and work with their parent to be able to develop skills for that line of work. Young girls assist their mothers with beadwork, household chores, chopping wood, etc., and boys are expected to work on canoe-making with the men and are given arrows to learn hunting skills at 5 or 6 years old.

Daily household activities provide the child the ability to learn cultural practices such as different food dishes, hygiene, and parenting skills, as well as the social values and religious beliefs. It is common for children in Indigenous American communities to learn through trial and error instead of explicit instruction. This is due to the cultural understanding of "echando a perder se enesena la gente" (throwing to lose, teaches people) which promotes optimism and growth of the child in the community, allowing the youth to feel comfortable making mistakes as long as they keep working towards their goal.

Children in the town of Tepoztlan are encouraged to participate in community activities. The people there believe that everyone can contribute something to community endeavors. Young children are encouraged to participate by being brought to various meetings and activities by their mothers, so as they grow older, they request to be admitted into the group on their own will.

=== Political movements and civic life ===
Some Indigenous American communities can incorporate young children into the political activities of the community. Political violence and displacement within the community of San Agustin Loxicha, Oaxaca created an important aspect of child participation in the community's struggle. In this community, it is common for young children to take part in marches or sit-ins, hunger strikes, school life, child play, and accept the political part of their lives instead of seeing it as a hardship or something to be pitied.

In the Nahua indigenous town of Tepoztlan located near Mexico City, children, adolescents, and older members of the community were involved in a 5-year long political movement against the construction of a golf course in their town. During assemblies children participated by aiding in the preparation of food and drinks for the crowd, while adolescents brought in groups of peers to further political involvement in the community. During marches and protest children and adolescents were active members of the civic movement. Any repression that the group suffered on behalf of the authorities was not seen as something negative in the experience of the youth, but was instead something that would further motivate their desire to be politically active. Through their integration into the political structure of the civil movement, the child's/adolescent's understanding of the issue expanded to such a degree that they would not only have physical presence in the group but would also be capable of offering new perspectives and potential solutions to the issue at hand. None of the children and adolescents involved were forced to do so. If a child showed an interest in the political movement they were encouraged by the adults to become participants but ultimately the choice was always left to them. Once a child decided to become involved the parents and other adults respected the pace and rhythm of that involvement.

=== Language brokering ===
In some immigrant communities, children link their family and friends to the environment around them by translating and paraphrasing words, phrases or occurring situations. This practice is known as language brokering and is used by children in immigrant communities to integrate themselves into family endeavors and into civil society. The child's contribution by language brokering integrates them into many environments, such as the doctor's office, at parent-teachers' conferences, banks, housing offices, and various sorts of negotiation activities. Subsequently, children who engage in language brokering are more likely to also be representatives of their community when transitioning into adulthood. Child integration has become very important to form linkages between new immigrant communities and the predominant culture and new forms of bureaucratic systems.

With the increased interaction in larger societies children in Indigenous Mayan communities who are bilingual help monolingual parents as interpreters. For example, the children will translate for parents when selling products in the barrios of Cancun, where the primary language is Spanish.

=== Productive endeavors ===
In some indigenous communities, children are often integrated as active participants into family and community work. Child work is often a vital contribution towards community productivity and typically involves non-exploitative motivations for children's engagement in work activities.

In some families, young children contribute to the family's finances by taking a job in a factory or a store under the supervision of a formal adult figure, while some join the family business under the oversight of their parents and older siblings. When children join the family business they tend to gain knowledge of a trade such as accounting, public relations and how to be able to time manage. Some children not only obtain an economic boost for the family as a whole, but also learn autonomy and altruism with regards to having their own earned income to support the family and also to spend for themselves.

== Children's motivation as integrated contributors ==
Children in Indigenous American communities pitch in to community endeavors because they experience their contribution having a tangible effect on their community. The children often contribute without being told and children get to learn how to do the activity as they contribute. However, children aren't just born with this way of learning by observation; they have been given the opportunity by being encouraged to attend, observing, and participating in mature activities. In indigenous communities, children's and adult's interests in participation must be viewed as equal, not just the adults forcing their views onto the children. Children are seen as a part of community just as much as adults. In many cultures, children are expected to take on tasks that are important to community. Children are also seen as integral members of the community, rather than separate from adults. Some cultures even give children control over specific goods, such as livestock or arable land and the expectations that come with this may also be seen as forms of participation. These ideas of children actively participating in their communities and influencing the society opens up opportunities for the participation of children

== History of age segregation in the West ==
Segregating children by age was not always the norm in the United States. A century and a half ago, children in the US had access to a wide range of adult activities and were integrated into multiple aspects of family functioning and survival. The change from this integration into segregation was a product of industrialization, Western formal schooling, child labor laws, social services agencies, and the rise of disciplines such as Psychology and Education. A combination of the above caused a shift from family working as a unit to separation of economic activities and services such as childcare emerged.
