= Teasing =

Bullying, with serious or playful intent

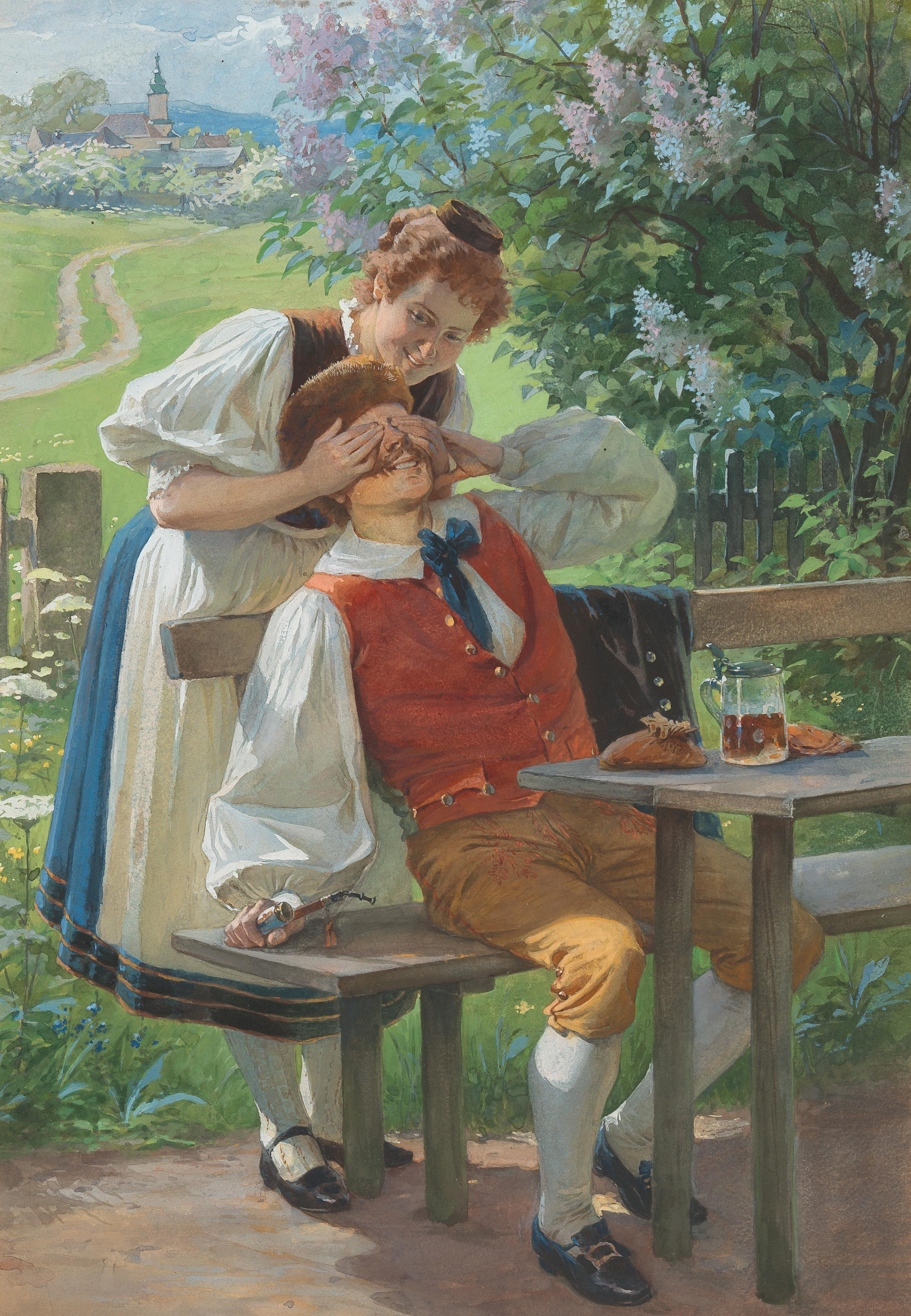
Painting of a Swabian woman teasing a man by covering his eyes from behind (1890)

Teasing has multiple meanings and uses. In human interactions, teasing exists in three major forms: playful, hurtful, and educative. Teasing can have a variety of effects, depending on how it is used and its intended effect. When teasing is unwelcome, it may be regarded as harassment or mobbing, especially in the workplace and school, or as a form of bullying or emotional abuse. If done in public, it may be regarded as humiliation.

Teasing can also be regarded as educative when it is used as a way of informal learning. Adults in some of the Indigenous American communities often tease children to playfully illustrate and teach them how their behavior negatively affects the community. Children in many Indigenous American communities also learn by observing what others do in addition to collaborating with them. Along with teasing, this form of informal learning is different from the ways that Western American children learn. Informal ways of child learning include mutual responsibility, as well as active collaboration with adults and peers. This differentiates from the more formal way of learning because it is not adult-oriented.

People may be teased on matters such as their appearance, weight, behavior, family, gender, faith, health/medical issues, abilities, clothing, and intelligence. From the victim's point of view, this kind of teasing is often hurtful, irrespective of the intention of the teaser. One may also tease an animal. Some animals, such as dogs and cats, may recognize this both as play or harassment.

== Nature ==
A common form of teasing is verbal bullying or taunting. This behavior is intended to distract, disturb, offend, sadden, anger, bother, irritate, or annoy the recipient. Because it is hurtful, it is different from joking and is generally accompanied by some degree of social rejection. Teasing can also mean "To make fun of; mock playfully" or "to be sarcastic".

Dacher Keltner uses Penelope Brown's classic study of the differences between "on-record" and "off-record" communication to illustrate how people must learn to read others' tone of voice and facial expressions to develop appropriate responses to teasing.

A form of teasing often overlooked is educational teasing. This form is commonly used by parents and caregivers in two Indigenous American communities and Mexican Heritage communities to guide their children toward more prosocial behavior. For example, when a parent teases a child who is throwing a tantrum for a piece of candy, the parent will pretend to give the child the candy, then take it away and ask the child to correct their behavior before giving it back. In this way, the parent teaches the child the importance of maintaining self-control. When adults educate children through teasing, they are informally teaching the children. This type of learning is often overlooked because it is different from the way Western American Communities teach their children.

Another form of teasing is pretending to give the other person something they desire, or giving it very slowly. This is usually done by arousing curiosity or desire, and may not actually involve the intent to satisfy or disclose. This form of teasing could be called "tantalizing", after the story of Tantalus. Tantalizing is generally playful among adults, but among children it can be hurtful, such as when one child acquires another's property and refuses to return it. It is also common in flirting and dating. For example, a person who is romantically interested in someone might reject an advance the first time to arouse interest and curiosity, and give in the second or third time.

Whether teasing is playful, hurtful, or educative is largely a matter of interpretation for the person being teased. If the person being teased feels harmed, then the teasing is hurtful. A difference in power between people may also make the behavior hurtful rather than playful. Ultimately, if someone perceives themselves as the victim of teasing and experiences it as unpleasant, it is considered hurtful. If parents' intentions are positive, as in many Indigenous American communities, then teasing within the community can be seen as an educational tool. The child may or may not understand that at the moment. If the other person continues to do it after being asked to stop, then it is a form of bullying or abuse.

Another way to look at teasing is as an honest reflection on differences, expressed in a joking fashion with the goal of "clearing the air". It can express comfort with the other, which can be comforting. Unlike being nice to someone's face while making disparaging remarks behind their back, teasing can be a way to express differences directly rather than internalize them.

== In Indigenous American communities ==
Some indigenous American communities use teasing to teach their children about the expectations and values of the community and to change negative behaviors. Teasing gives children a better understanding of how their behavior affects the people around them. Teasing in Indigenous American communities is used to learn community acceptance, humbleness, correcting behavior and social control.

In some Mexican indigenous American communities, teasing is used in an effective educative way. Teasing is found more useful because it allows the child to feel and understand the relevant effect of their behavior instead of receiving out-of-context feedback. Some parents in Indigenous American communities believe it mildly embarrasses the children in a shared reference to give them a good sense of the consequences of their behavior. This type of teasing is thought to teach children to be less egocentric, teaches autonomy and responsibility to monitor their own behavior. Parental teasing also is practiced to encourage the child to think of their behavior in a social context. Some Indigenous American mothers have reported that this urges the children to understand how their behavior affects others around them. From examples in Eisenberg's article, parents use teasing as a way of reinforcing relationships and participation in group/community activities (prosocial behavior). Parents tease their children to be able to "control the behavior of the child and to have fun with them".

An Inuit principle of learning that follows a similar teasing pattern is known as issumaksaiyuk, meaning to cause thought. Oftentimes, adults pose questions or hypothetical situations to the children (sometimes dangerous) but in a teasing, playful manner, often dramatizing their responses. These questions raise the child's awareness to issues surrounding their community, as well as give them a sense of agency within the community as a member capable of having an effect and creating change. Once the child begins to answer the questions reasonably, like an adult, the questions would stop.

In some Cherokee communities, teasing is a way of diffusing aggressive or hostile situations and teaching the individual about the consequences of their behavior. It allows the individual to feel how their behaviors are affecting others and control their behavior.

== Other usages ==
To tease, or to "be a tease" in a sexual sense can refer to the use of posture, language or other means of flirting to cause another person to become sexually aroused. Such teasing may or may not be a prelude to intercourse, an ambiguity which can lead to uncomfortable situations. In a more physical sense, it can also refer to sexual stimulation.

Teasing is also used to describe playing part of a song at a concert. Jam bands will often quote the main riff of another song during jams.

"Tease it" is also used as a slang term to smoke marijuana. The word "tease" can also be used as a noun to stand for marijuana.

In a very different context, hair can be teased, "ratted", or "backcombed". As the name suggests, backcombing involves combing the hair backwards from end to root to intentionally tangle the strands to create volume. It can also be done excessively in sections to create dreadlocks.

== See also ==
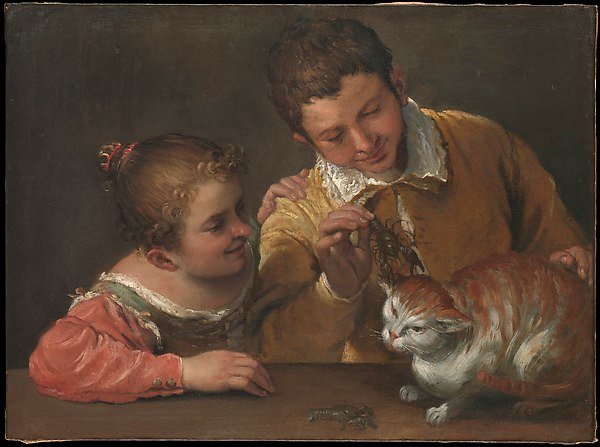
Two Children teasing a cat by Annibale Carracci (current location Metropolitan Museum of Art)

- Bullying
- Eve teasing
- Mobbing
- Sarcasm
- Sardonic
- Social rejection
- Taunting
