= Informal learning =

Category of learning situation

Informal learning is characterized by a low degree of planning and organizing of the learning context, learning support, learning time, and learning objectives. It differs from formal learning, non-formal learning, and self-regulated learning, as it has no set objective in its learning outcomes, but an intent to act from the learner's standpoint (e.g., to solve a problem). The term is often conflated with non-formal learning and self-directed learning. It is widely used in the context of corporate training and education in relation to return on investment (ROI), or return on learning (ROL). It is also used when referring to science education, in relation to citizen science, or informal science education.

Typical mechanisms of informal learning include trial and error or learning-by-doing, modeling, feedback, and reflection. This includes heuristic language building, socialization, enculturation, and play. Informal learning is a popular learning method that incorporates participation or learning through knowledge creation, in contrast with the traditional practice of teacher-centered learning via knowledge acquisition. Estimates suggest that about 70–90% of adult learning takes place informally and outside educational institutions.

The conflated definition of informal and non-formal learning explicates mechanisms of learning that organically occur outside the realm of traditional instructor-led programs. This may include participating in self-study programs, navigation of performance support materials and systems, practicing incidental skills, receiving coaching or mentoring, seeking advice from peers, or participating in communities of practice.

Informal learning is common in communities where individuals have opportunities to observe and participate in social activities. Cited advantages of informal learning include flexibility and adaptation to learning needs, direct transfer of learning into practice, and rapid resolution of work-related problems. For improving employees' performance, task execution is considered the most important source of learning.

== Characterizations ==
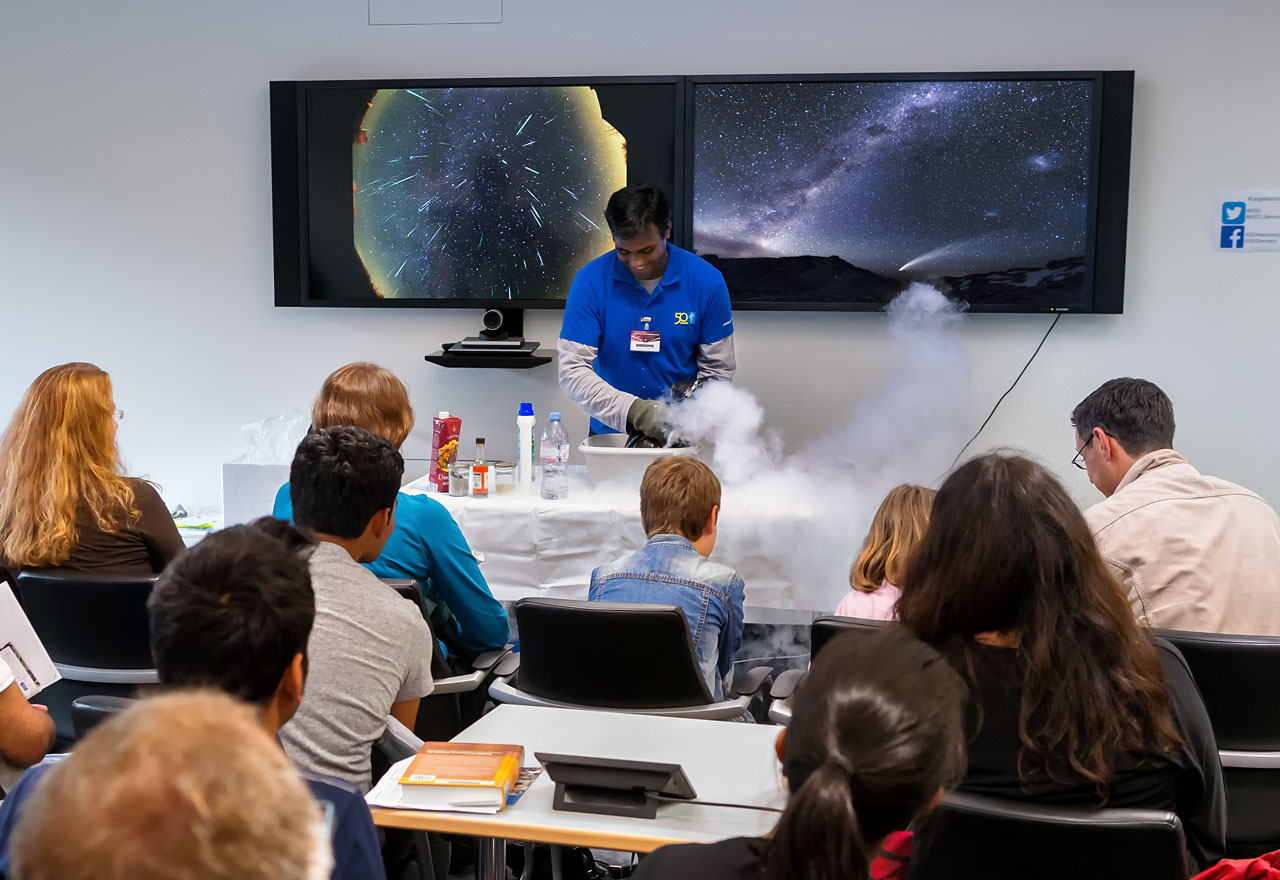
Open House Day at ESO's Headquarters.

Informal learning can be characterized as follows:

- It usually takes place outside educational establishments;
- It does not follow a specified curriculum and is not often professionally organized but rather originates accidentally and sporadically in association with certain occasions from the changing of practical requirements;
- It is not necessarily planned pedagogically, which adheres to a system oriented around subjects, tests, and qualifications, but rather, it is planned after unconsciously incidental or consciously intended intuition that is holistically problem-related and related to actual situations and fitness for life;
- It is experienced directly in its "natural" function of everyday life;
- It is often spontaneous and creative;
- It is a key component to an alternative learning system coined as the Learning by Observing and Pitching In (LOPI), which is based on the learning methods observed to be common in many Indigenous American communities.

== History ==
The origin of informal learning has been traced back to John Dewey through his theories about learning from experience. The American philosopher Mary Parker Follett broadened the context of informal education from school to all areas of everyday life and described education as a continuous life task. Building on this work by Dewey and Follett, the American educator Eduard C. Lindemann first used the term "informal learning". The term was later introduced by Malcolm Knowles when he published his work, Informal Adult Education in 1950.

At first, informal learning was only delimited from formal school learning and nonformal learning in courses. Marsick and Watkins take up this approach and go one step further in their definition. They, too, begin with the organizational form of learning and call those learning processes informal which are non-formal or not formally organized and are not financed by institutions. An example for a wider approach is Livingstone's definition which is oriented towards autodidactic and self-directed learning and places special emphasis on the self-definition of the learning process by the learner. Livingstone explained that explicit informal learning is distinguished from tacit informal learning and socialization in the sense that the individual seeks learning in this setting and creates the conditions for it by putting himself or herself in situations or engaging with others so that learning is possible.

== Differences between informal and non-formal learning ==
As noted above, informal learning is often confused with non-formal learning. Non-formal learning has often been used to describe organized learning outside of the formal education system, either being short-term, voluntary, and having few, if any, prerequisites. However, they typically have a curriculum and often a facilitator.

== Other perspectives ==
Merriam et al. in 2007 stated:

Informal learning, Schugurensky (2000) suggests, has its own internal forms that are important to distinguish in studying the phenomenon. He proposes three forms: self-directed learning, incidental learning, and socialization, or tacit learning. These differ among themselves in terms of intentionality and awareness at the time of the learning experience. Self-directed learning, for example, is intentional and conscious; incidental learning, which Marsick and Watkins (1990) describe as an accidental by-product of doing something else, is unintentional but after the experience she or he becomes aware that some learning has taken place; and finally, socialization or tacit learning is neither intentional nor conscious (although we can become aware of this learning later through 'retrospective recognition') (Marsick, & Watkins, 1990, p. 6)

— p. 36

In 2012, Bennett extended Schugurenksky's conceptualization from 2000 of informal learning by recommending four modes of informal learning:

1. self-directed, which is conscious and intentional
2. incidental, which is conscious and unintentional
3. tacit, which replaces socialization and is both nonconscious and unintentional
4. integrative, which is nonconscious and intentional.

Drawing upon implicit processing literature, she further defined integrative learning as "a learning process that combines intentional nonconscious processing of tacit knowledge with conscious access to learning products and mental images" and theorized two possible sub-processes: knowledge shifting and knowledge sublimation, which describe the limited access learners have to tacit knowledge.

However, the assumption that informal learning can also be non-intentional contradicts more recent definitions of informal learning. If the learning person has a learning goal in mind and independently monitors goal achievement, it is self-regulated learning.

== In American Indigenous communities ==
People in many Indigenous communities of the Americas often learn through observation and participation in everyday life of their respective communities and families. Barbara Rogoff, a professor of psychology, and her colleagues describe the ways in which children in Indigenous communities can learn by observing and participating in community endeavors, having an eagerness to contribute, fulfilling valuable roles, and finding a sense of belonging in their community. These learning experiences rely on children's incorporation in the community and the child's attentiveness. This form of informal learning allows the children to collaborate in social endeavors, which grants the child the opportunity to learn by pitching in.

Learning occurs through socialization processes in one's culture and community. Learning by Observing and Pitching In (LOPI) is an informal learning model often seen in many Indigenous communities of the Americas. Children can be seen participating alongside adults in many daily activities within the community. An example is the process where children learn slash-and-burn agriculture by being present in the situation and contributing when possible. Noteworthy is children's own initiative and assumption of responsibility to perform tasks for the households' benefit. Many Indigenous communities provide self-paced opportunities to kids, and allow exploration and education without parental coercion. Collaborative input is highly encouraged and valued. Both children and adults are actively involved in shared endeavors. Their roles as learner and expert are flexible, while the observer participates with active concentration. Indigenous ways of learning include practices such as observation, experiential learning, and apprenticeship.

Child work, alongside and combined with play, occupies an important place in American Indigenous children's time and development. The interaction of a Navajo girl assisting her mother weaving and who eventually becomes a master weaver herself illustrates how the child's presence and the availability of these activities allow the child to learn through observation. Children start at the periphery, observing and imitating those around them, before moving into the center of activities under supervision and guidance. An example of two-year-old Indigenous Mexican girl participating in digging-the-holes project with her mother highlights children's own initiation to help, after watching, and enthusiasm to share the task with family and community. Work is part of a child's development from an early age, starting with simple tasks that merge with play and develop to various kinds of useful work. The circumstances of everyday routine create opportunities for the culturally meaningful activities and sensitive interactions on which a child's development depends. Children of the Chillihuani observe their environment as a place of respect, and learn from observation. Many of them become herders by informal learning in observation.

Children in Nicaragua will often learn to work the land or learn to become street vendors by watching other individuals in their community perform it. These activities provide opportunities for children to learn and develop through forms of social learning which are made up of everyday experiences rather than a deliberate curriculum, and contain ordinary settings in which children's social interaction and behavior occur. Informal learning for children in American Indigenous communities can take place at work where children are expected to contribute.

=== Nonverbal communication as a learning tool ===
In terms of the cultural variation between traditional Indigenous American and European-American middle class, the prevalence of nonverbal communication can be viewed as being dependent on each culture's definition of achievement. Often in mainstream middle-class culture, success in school and work settings is gained through practicing competitiveness and working for personal gain. The learning and teaching practices of traditional Indigenous Americans generally prioritize harmony and cooperation over personal gain. In order to achieve mutual respect in teachings, what is often relied on in Indigenous American culture is nonverbal communication.

Nonverbal communication in Indigenous communities creates pathways of knowledge by watching and then doing. An example where nonverbal behavior can be used as a learning tool can be seen in Chillihuani culture. Children in this community learn about growing crops by observing the actions and respect adults have for the land. They learn that caring for their crops is vital for them to grow and in turn for the community to thrive. Similarly, when children participate in rituals, they learn the importance of being part of the community by watching how everyone interacts. This again needs no explicit verbal communication, it relies solely on observing the world around. Chillihuani culture does not explicitly verbalize expectations. Their knowledge is experienced rather than explained through modeled behavior for community benefit.

In the indigenous culture of the Matsigenka, infants are kept in close proximity to their mother and members of the community. The infant does not go far from the mother at any time. In this way, the child is encouraged to explore away from the mother and other family members who will still keep watch. As the child wanders, he may come to a place that is unknown and potentially dangerous but the mother will not stop him, she will just watch as he explores. The lack of verbal reprimand or warning from an adult or elder enable the child to assimilate his surroundings more carefully.

== Formal and informal education ==
To fully understand informal learning, it is useful to define the terms "formal" and "informal" education. Formal education can be defined as a setting that is highly institutionalized, can be possibly bureaucratic, while being curriculum driven, and formally recognized with grades, diplomas, or other forms of certifications.

== Research and data ==
Merriam and others (2007) state: "studies of informal learning, especially those asking about adults' self-directed learning projects, reveal that upwards of 90% of adults are engaged in hundreds of hours of informal learning. It has also been estimated that the great majority (upwards of 70%) of learning in the workplace is informal ... although billions of dollars each year are spent by business and industry on formal training programs". Both formal and informal learning are considered integral processes for Virtual Human Resource Development, with informal learning the stronger form.

Coffield uses the metaphor of an iceberg to illustrate the dominant status of informal learning, which at the same time has much lower visibility in the education sector compared to formal learning: The part of the iceberg that is visibly above the water surface and makes up one third represents formal learning; the two thirds below the water surface that are invisible at first glance represent informal learning. While formal learning can be compared to a bus ride—the route is predetermined and the same for all passengers—informal learning is more like a ride on a bicycle, where the person riding can determine the route and speed individually.

== Experiences and examples ==
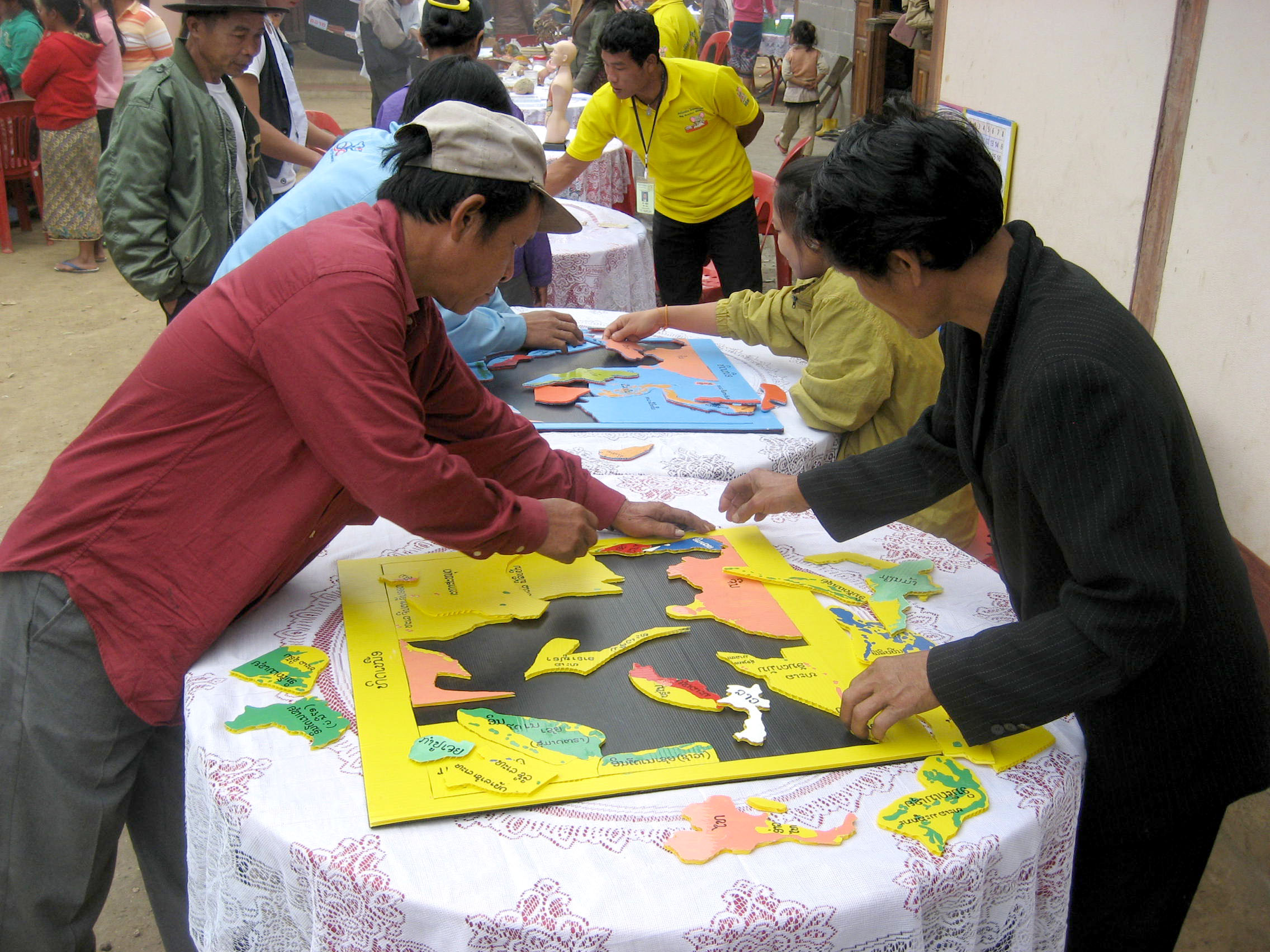
Lao villagers assemble jigsaw maps of Southeast Asia. These maps were made by Big Brother Mouse, a literacy project in Laos. It was the first time any of them had seen a jigsaw puzzle of any sort.

Informal knowledge is information that has not been externalized or captured and the primary locus of the knowledge may be inside someone's head. For example, in the case of language acquisition, a mother may teach a child basic concepts of grammar and language at home, prior to the child entering a formal education system. In such a case, the mother has a tacit understanding of language structures, syntax and morphology, but she may not be explicitly aware of what these are.

Other examples of informal knowledge transfer include instant messaging, a spontaneous meeting on the Internet, a phone call to someone who has information you need, or a chance meeting by the water cooler.

Experience indicates that much of the learning for performance is informal.

In the UK, the government formally recognized the benefits of informal learning in "The Learning Revolution" White Paper published on March 23, 2009. The Learning Revolution Festival ran in October 2009 and funding has been used by libraries—which offer a host of informal learning opportunities such as book groups, "meet the author" events and family history sessions—to run activities such as The North East Festival of Learning.

== Trends in formal and informal learning ==
40% of adults have taught themselves at some point and respondents in a survey indicated that they were twice as likely to participate in independent learning as traditional learning. The average adult spends 10 hours a week (500 hours a year) on informal learning practices. As a whole, this type of knowledge is more learner-centered and situational in response to the interests or needed application of the skill to a particular workforce. Formal training programs have limited success in increasing basic skills for individuals older than age 25, therefore, these individuals rely mostly on on-the-job training.

Although rates of formal education have increased, many adults entering the workforce are lacking the basic math, reading and interpersonal skills that the "unskilled" labor force requires. The lines between formal and informal learning have been blurred due to the higher rates of college attendance. The largest increase in population for manual or low-skilled labor is in individuals who attended college but did not receive a degree. A recent collection of cross-sectional surveys were conducted and polled employers across the United States to gauge which skills are required for jobs which do not require college degrees. These surveys concluded that 70% require some kind of customer service aspect, 61% require reading or writing paragraphs, 65% require math, 51% require the use of computers. With regard to training and academic credentials, 71% require a high school diploma, 61% require specific vocational experience.

== Business perspective ==
The majority of companies that provide training are currently involved only with the formal side of the continuum. Most of today's investments are on the formal side. The net result is that companies spend the most money on the smallest part—25%—of the learning equation. The other 75% of learning happens as the learner creatively "adopts and adapts to ever changing circumstances".

However, a direct support of informal learning is considered difficult, because learning happens within the work process and cannot be planned by companies. An indirect support of learning by providing a positive learning environment is however possible. Social support by colleagues and managers should be mentioned in particular. More experienced colleagues can act as learning experts and mentors. Managers can act as role models with regard to obtaining and offering feedback on their own work performance. Admitting own failures and dealing with failures constructively also encourages employees to take advantage of learning opportunities at work.

== See also ==
- Networked learning
- Unschooling
