= Childhood in Maya society =

Child-rearing practices in ancient Maya culture.

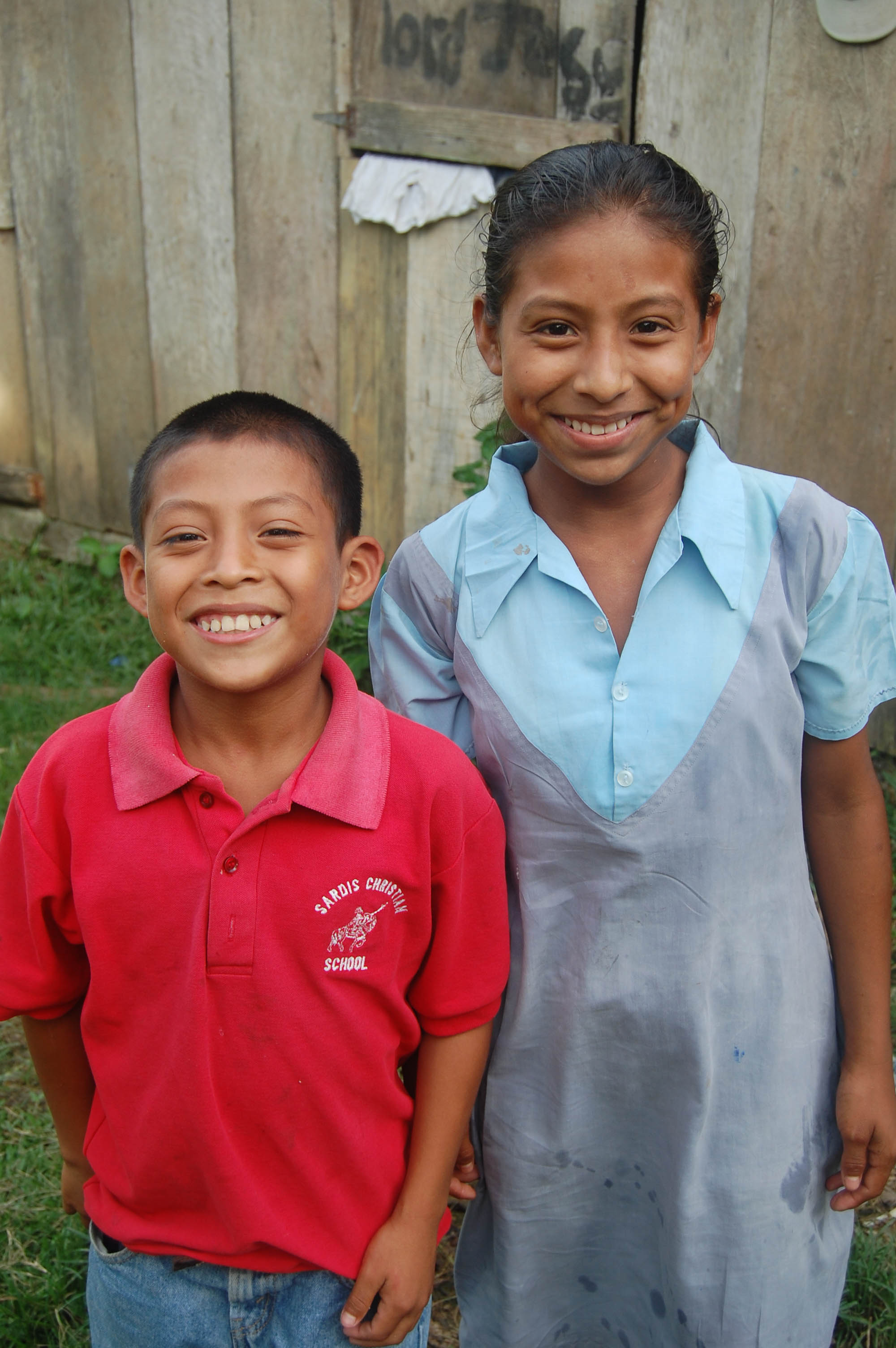
Mayan children in 2009

The role of the children in ancient Mayan civilization was first, and foremost, to help their elders. Once children turned five or six, they were expected to contribute to the family and community. They were treated as young adults and received more responsibilities as they grew older.

== Adolescents ==
As an adolescent in the Mayan Society, as in any other culture/society, there are "norms" or "responsibilities" that are learned and need to be followed through. In the Mayan culture, children were raised and treated as adults. Mayan children are raised to help and learn from their parents; this includes household chores, survival skills, and hunting skills if needed. For the most part, there are different "norms" or "responsibilities" for genders. In the perfect example, the mother would show and teach her daughter her skill, and a father would show his son his skill, if the father had a job, then he would show his son how to get the job required done.

Young girls were expected to perform household duties, while young boys were to help their fathers in farming.

Mostly women raised the children, but when a boy was about four or five, his father would begin training him.

When adolescents turned 15, they were expected to be independent. Today, this tradition of work ethic still applies to adolescents.

Children in the Mayan culture most likely already had their life planned out already. The females would be taught by their mothers everything there could be to learn and the same for the males, the father would teach their sons the "job" the father would be in. In the Mayan culture, it was believed that the kids are always being taught survival skills and the ways of their culture.

== Rituals and children ==
The Maya desired some unnatural physical characteristics for their children. For instance, at a very young age boards were pressed on babies' foreheads to create a flattened surface. This process was widespread among the upper class.

Another practice was to cross babies' eyes. To do this, objects were dangled in front of a newborn's eyes until the newborn's eyes were completely and permanently crossed. In addition, there were a few unique customs regarding children. For example, most Maya children were named according to the day they were born. Every day of the year had a specific name for both boys and girls and parents were expected to follow that practice.

== Death ==
Most burial sites for children were not as elaborate as adult burial sites. "Infants/toddlers generally lacked offerings… for [children] who died before reaching the age of five, the only elaboration or special treatment consisted of inclusion within a probable family group…" However, some burial sites for children did contain more gifts than other youngsters. This suggests that the family had a great deal of remorse and/or the child had high standings.

== Values in children ==
Several values were stressed to Mayan children. Not only was strong work ethics desirable, but working for the betterment of the community was necessary.

Families were extremely important to the Maya culture, and respecting the leaders in one's family was imperative. "A sense of responsibility is another important quality that children have to learn. This includes independence, self-confidence, and the ability to make decisions." It is believed that the most important quality for children to have was common sense, and they received this by shadowing their parents.

Among Yucatec Maya parents, the ceremony called hetsmek' is still practiced even among professionals living in Mérida, the capital of Yucatán.

== Maya children today ==
Maya populations are present today in many areas of Central and South America, such as Guatemala. There is limited research on the lives of Maya children, mostly because developmental research has primarily involved European-American children. However, the goals for Maya children's socialization and daily activities differ from those of other cultures, especially those that are most studied.

=== Learning ===
Children in many Maya communities often engage in different socialization patterns than those commonly found in European-American communities. Specifically, Maya cultures commonly emphasize the primacy of community activities (in which adults and children are participants), the importance of parental beliefs, and the independence of children's motivation in their socialization. Children in Maya communities develop within the context of work and other family activities. They commonly learn through observing and engaging in work with others.

Children in modern-day Maya communities observe and participate in work with people of all ages. Young children in Maya communities such as San Pedro La Laguna have been observed listening in on the work of older children, adults, and elders. These children are expected to observe the activities going on around them for their learning to take place. The mix of interaction between age groups in Maya communities is important to their learning. Age segregation does not play an active role in the learning patterns of Maya children, as they interact with both adults and children of all ages. Mayan siblings also play an active role in directing each other's learning.

Children in Maya communities also observe and participate in adult work to become active members of their community. Though children in European American communities do not engage in as much productive or goal-driven work, Maya children see this work as embodying their sense of self-worth.

Maya children engage in less imaginary play than children from many middle-class Western communities. When European-American adults play with children, the play is seen as an educational exercise, but play that Maya children partake in is often an emulation of mature work happening around them For example, a child will pretend to "weave" on a make-believe loom, or "wash clothes" by pouring water on a cloth. In this way, Maya children are learning through play.

Engaging in play that emulates work, and providing actual contributions to work, are characteristic of a style of learning referred to as Learning by Observing and Pitching In (which was previously called Intent Community Participation). This approach involves the learner observing and listening, directed by their initiative and concentration. This individual drive to learn is coupled with the learner's expected participation in shared endeavors. In other words, Maya children learn through Intent Community Participation because they are self-motivated to learn, and are included and given responsibilities. Maya children are respected as capable contributors to their community from as young as age 3 or 4.

This style of learning can be contrasted with other learning styles, such as assembly-line instruction. Assembly-line instruction is the approach taken by most Westernized schooling. Assembly-line instruction is based on the transmission of knowledge from experts to subordinates, in a way that does not facilitate purposeful activity. Maya Children do not participate primarily in this style of learning, because they learn through inclusion and hands-on experience. Because of this form of learning, Mayan children are much more observant in their environment as compared to European-American children. Learning through observation and participation develops skills such as dual attentiveness which supports their way of life and learning. Through methods such as Learning by Observing and Pitching In, Maya children work as a community to build their skills for contributing to their community.
