= Barbara Rogoff =

American academic

- Occupations: Professor; academic
- Title: UCSC Distinguished Professor of Psychology

Academic background
- Education: Pomona College (B.A.); Harvard University (Ph.D.)

Academic work
- Institutions: University of California, Santa Cruz

Barbara Rogoff is an American academic who is UCSC Distinguished Professor of Psychology at the University of California, Santa Cruz. Her research is in different learning between cultures and bridges psychology and anthropology.

== Education and career ==
Rogoff graduated from Pomona College with a B.A. in psychology in 1971. She earned her Ph.D. from Harvard University in 1977.

Rogoff investigates cultural variation in learning processes and settings, with special interest in communities where schooling has not been prevalent.

Rogoff is the recipient of a Distinguished Lifetime Contributions Award from the Society for Research in Child Development and UCSC's 2017 Martin M. Chemers Award for Outstanding Research. Her fellowships include the National Academy of Education, the American Anthropological Association, the Association for Psychological Science, the American Psychological Association, and the American Educational Research Association.

== Books ==
Rogoff's book Learning Together: Children and Adults in a School Community, co-authored with teachers Carolyn Turkanis and Leslee Bartlett, profiled Salt Lake City's "Open Classroom," a parent-cooperative education program that is now a K-8 charter school.

Rogoff authored a chapter, "Cognition as a Collaborative Process", in the edited Handbook of Child Psychology. In it, she discusses Constructivist theorist Piaget and Sociocultural theorist Vygotsky in relation to collaboration, the role of adult experts in the process of learning, peer interaction and community collaborative sociocultural activities.

Most popular, Rogoff work is The Cultural Nature of Human Development and the recent one Developing Destinies: A Mayan Midwife and Town. This book outlines how cultural practices guide one's participation and how community members choose and change cultural practices.
