= Positive education =

Positive education is an approach to education that draws on positive psychology's emphasis on individual strengths and personal motivation to promote learning. Unlike traditional school approaches, positive schooling teachers use techniques that focus on individual students' well-being. Teachers use methods such as developing tailored goals for each student to engender learning and working with them to develop the plans and motivation to reach their goals. Rather than pushing students to achieve at a set grade level, seen through the emphasis of standardized testing, this approach attempts to customize learning goals to individual students' levels. Instead of setting students to compete against one another, learning is viewed as a cooperative process where teachers learn to respect their students and each student's input is valued.

== Theoretical approaches ==
Several early psychologists and thinkers, including those listed below, have paved the way for the adoption of positive psychology techniques in the classroom. (Note: Not all of these approaches have been labelled as "positive education".)

- John Dewey was among the earliest advocates to impact the field of positive schooling. John Dewey recognized schools as primary institutions for the development of democracy. He opposed the repressive atmosphere of schools, especially elementary and secondary schools, and emphasized the importance of promoting learners' ability to absorb and recreate information in their minds. He proposed constructivism, which argues that individual learners should take in information and creatively construct it according to their own capacities and views. This approach opposes the traditional view of education in which teachers pass down knowledge to the students through direct communication. In summary, Dewey's view of education, similar to progressive education implies that people learn best in environments that are applicable to the real world and that allow them to learn through activities and practical problem solving.
- Maria Montessori, the originator of the Montessori system, put forth views relating to positive schooling as well. The Montessori system reflects the positive psychology principle of creativity. Creativity, known as one of the twenty-four character strengths, is offered with the freedom for children to choose how they learn, known as self-directed learning. Children are provided with hands-on materials that not only inspire creativity but also stimulate interest in learning, as they can express themselves through learning rather than feel forced to work.
- Sophie Christophy coined the term "Education Positivity" in 2018, with the founding of self-directed, consent-based, and children's rights-based education. "Education Positivity" is an approach that transcends traditional subject silos and hierarchies, instead finding educational and learning validity in emergent and diverse interests, curiosities, and problem-solving, pursued individually and/or in collaboration.
- Elizabeth Hurlock was one of the first psychologists to actually carry out experiments with positive psychology techniques to measure the effects of positive schooling in the field of education. Hurlock studied the effectiveness of praise and reproach in the classroom, arguing that praise was a more effective long-term incentive. Her studies found that praise was more effective for children regardless of age, ability and gender.
- Jennifer Henderlong and Mark Lepper echo Hurlock's arguments that praise is beneficial to enhancing children's intrinsic motivation. Although some research questions the effectiveness of praise, appropriate use of praise is shown to correlate positively with confidence and better academic performance. They support that praise increases personal beliefs about one's ability to perform given tasks. Also, cognitive evaluation theory supports that praise enhances individuals' perception about performance outcomes and that positive moods induced by praise may contribute to effective outcomes.
- Arthur Chickering and Zelda Gamson focus on the pedagogy, the teacher's "how," rather than content and subject matter being taught, which is partly due to the scarce empirical research that has been done on college curriculum. Chickering and Gamson give seven research-supported principles regarding education and learning in the undergraduate environment for teachers to follow:
1. Teachers are to encourage contact between students and faculty. Chickering and Gamson explain that student-faculty relationships motivate students to keep working hard toward future goals and provide support and resources.
2. To develop reciprocity and cooperation among students, promoting a collaborative learning environment, rather than a competitive one. This gives students opportunities to work together and learn from one another, which has been shown to strengthen understanding.
3. Teachers should use active learning techniques, relate material to topics students already care about, and get students to ask, "What does this concept look like in my own life?"
4. Teachers are to give prompt feedback. Balancing assessment and feedback results in efficient learning, as students realize what they do and do not know and learn to assess themselves.
5. Emphasizing time on task, or sharing effective time management strategies to give students an understanding for their time expectations.
6. Communicating high expectations has shown to be very successful. Expectations that teachers implement give students a gage for how much potential they think that they have.
7. Respecting students' diverse talents and ways of learning accounts for all learning styles and allows students to figure out how they learn best.
- Elliot Aronson has pioneered the jigsaw classroom, a theoretical approach for 3rd-12th grade classes which emphasizes the individual academic strengths of children and seeks to make them peer-teachers in a cooperative learning setting. In this approach, students are divided into competency groups of four to six students; then individual group members break off and work with "experts" on their topic from other groups, researching that specific section of material together. These students then return to their groups and present on their part of the material. This approach encourages group engagement, listening, and cooperation among peers, and incorporates aspects of play into learning. It has shown positive effects on academic performance and liking for school and peers. This may be because increased liking leads to self-esteem, which, if absent, can affect academic performance. It is also possible that jigsaw methods increase participation while reducing anxiety, increase empathy, and change attributions of success and failure. The Jigsaw method has been proposed as a strategy to improve race relations since it meets the criteria posed by contact theory for reducing racial prejudice. Intergroup contact theory states that interracial contact will only improve race relations if ethnic groups are of equal status, pursue a common goal of mutual interest for groups, and are sanctioned by institutions.

Another model which utilizes positive education in school is the response to intervention model. Response to intervention is a preventative model that works to provide tailored assistance to at-risk students who are exhibiting insufficient academic achievement, though its principles have been used to address behavioral issues as well. The central components of this model include a core curriculum based on scientific evidence, universal screening, progress monitoring, and decisions about acceptable progress in subsequent tiers. RTI utilizes a multi-tiered structure: at each tier, students are screened and then monitored. The model was originally created to help identify learning disabilities, so that the adoption of a core curriculum ensures that inadequate teaching is not the cause for poor performance. Those who struggle even when adhering to a research-supported curriculum are given more intense instruction at a higher tier. When behavior is being considered, school or local norms for behavior rates are used when screening.

The Positive Behavior Support (PBS) model is structured similarly to RTI but addresses behavior problems. This model adopts a prevention and intervention approach, emphasizing the importance of building prosocial skills, in addition to reducing bad behavior while implementing a three-tiered "continuum of supports" from a universal to an individual level. The strategies at the universal level include defined expected behaviors, strategies to teach expected behavior, strategies to encourage and practice appropriate behavior, and consistency within and across school systems. The second level involves providing targeted support for individuals and groups that are at risk. The final level concerns individuals that persist in their bad behavior and involves functional behavior assessments, instruction-based plans, and collective comprehensive plans including families and community agencies. PBS can be implemented at a school-wide (SWPBIS), district-wide or even statewide level. Recently, local school systems and even state departments of education have been demonstrating a rising interest in PBS because the program requires little training time and limited money and staff. In 2002, the New Hampshire Department of Education organized a statewide initiative to introduce PBS into New Hampshire schools. PBS has also become popular in Maryland, as more than 33% of state's schools implemented the program in 2006.

== Empirical findings ==
One major empirical finding in support for positive learning techniques has been the positive effect of praise-based discipline techniques in classrooms. Elizabeth Hurlock studied the day-to-day improvement of students who were praised, reproached, and ignored. Students were divided into these groups in addition to a control group after they had been administered an arithmetic test, and were subsequently tested each day over an additional period of four days. After the first testing session, the control group was tested in a separate room from the other groups. In the treatment room, the "praise" group of students were invited to the front of the room and praised for their work as well as encouraged to do better. The "reproach" group was called up and reproved for their poor performance, while the ignored group received no recognition. Some significant findings include the fact that the praised group experienced the most initial improvement, followed by the reproach group and then the ignored group, while no improvement was seen in the control group. The ignored and control group also showed a decrease in accuracy towards the end of the testing period. When children were grouped according to academic achievement into the categories "superior", "average" and "inferior" after the first test, praise was the most influential incentive for all students, though it was most effective for the "inferior" group. As a whole, the results suggested that praise was the most accurate incentive regardless of age, sex, initial ability, or accuracy.

While empirical evidence supports the positive effects of praise, there exists a debate regarding whether the jigsaw classroom method is successful in various areas. Two studies by Christopher Bratt, who was interested in the jigsaw classroom's ability to improve prejudice based on ethnicity, examined the effects of the jigsaw classroom method on intergroup relations; yet, no positive effects were found. The first studied the method's effect on majority members' outgroup attitudes, attitudes towards school empathy, and intergroup friendships by examining two jigsaw classrooms and two regular classrooms of multi-ethnic 6th graders. The second measured common ingroup identity in the majority sample and outgroup attitudes in the minority sample in addition to the previous variables in a sample of 8th–10th graders in 46 multi-ethnic classrooms, utilizing a matched pair design between jigsaw and regular classrooms. No evidence of any significant effects of the jigsaw method was found in the second study, while outgroup attitudes improved in study 1. Yet, Bratt believed the findings from study 1 were spurious, arguing that the fact that one of the classrooms in study 1 was taught by two teachers while the others had one teacher may have influenced the results.

A study by Walker & Crogan yielded evidence that supported the utility of the jigsaw classroom. The study investigated the relationship between teaching methods such as cooperative learning and the jigsaw classroom and outcomes in academic performance, self-esteem, attitude of school, attitude of peers, and racial prejudice. The study was designed to investigate solely the jigsaw classroom method, yet one of the teachers altered her mode of instruction due to the behavior of disruptive students so that it resembled cooperative learning. As a result, the experimenters modified their objectives, believing they could compare the effectiveness of cooperation, necessary in both methods, and task interdependence, characteristics only of the jigsaw classroom. They concluded that academic performance, liking of peers, and racial prejudice improved under the jigsaw classroom method while cooperative learning appeared to intensify intergroup tension, yet major methodological issues may cast doubt on the validity of these findings. Many of the classrooms did not adhere very strictly to proper plan for implementation of the jigsaw classroom and the researchers had to abandon their original design. Also, the fact that one of the teachers had to forgo the jigsaw classroom method due to student misbehavior is telling. Bratt argues that studies professing results that support improved intergroup relations are similarly flawed.

The Circle of Courage curriculum is, yet, another practical attempt for implementing positive learning techniques. The Circle of Courage is an educational philosophy developed by Larry Brendtro, Martin Brokenleg, and Steve Van Bockern, that is based on Native American values and Western science. Belonging, mastery, independence, and generosity are four core values that are intended to integrate Western and indigenous cultures. Deborah Espiner and Diane Guild monitor the progress and success of Mt. Richmond Special School after implementing the Circle of Courage curriculum and Response Ability Pathways (RAP) program. The school managers established a positive learning environment based on these two programs, which were designed for dynamic interaction between teachers and students. Before launching the actual classroom environment, five months were taken to introduce new learning methods to school staff and students. In general, participants acknowledged that new modules brought positive impact in the school. One recognizable outcome was that RAP training facilitated the connection between teachers and challenging students. Additionally, new positive education methods also led teachers to discover the potentials of their pupils.

When examining programs that attempt to help children overcome behavioral issues that prevent them from displaying their full potential, research has provided support for the efficacy of PBS. A study by Barrett and Lewis-Palmer investigated the statewide implementation of PBS in 467 schools. The results indicated that overall, the program had been successfully implemented and displayed high fidelity to the theoretical model. Elementary schools reported 43% less office discipline referrals (ODRs) per day, while middle schools reported 37% less ODRs per day and K-(8–12) schools reported 72% less ODRs per day when compared with the national averages. Schools also demonstrated significant reductions in suspension rates in as little as one year. Another study by Muscott and Mann examined the first cohort of 28 New Hampshire early childhood education programs and K-12 schools that had implemented PBS in accordance with the directive of the Department of Education. Within three months after the program was introduced, 54% of schools met the standards of successful PBS implementation and 88% of schools had done so two years after implementation. In terms of behavior issues, a school was considered successful if 80–90% of elementary students and 70–80 middle school students received less than 2 ODRs during a school year. After the first year, 70% of schools has achieved these results. Between the first and second years, the schools reduced ODRs by 28% collectively.

== Controversies and legal issues ==
Positive education is not uniformly agreed on as an effective teaching strategy. The No Child Left Behind Act (NCLB) was proposed in 2001 to improve the conditions of public schools in the United States. The act has imposed standardized testing on all schools that are government-run and receive government funding. Each school's test results are analyzed, and schools with continuously low test scores are obligated to develop an improvement plan. There is still much debate whether the act has a positive effect on America's education system, since it is based on performance-based education reform. Supporters of the act believe that setting measurable goals will improve individual educational success and that statewide tests will improve the situation of public schools. Major teacher's unions and other opponents, however, have doubts about the act's effectiveness, which may be due to the mixed results of NCLB, arguing over the ineffectiveness of standardized tests and higher standards for teacher qualification. Opponents also argue that standardized tests are exceedingly biased and that higher standards for teacher qualification simply contribute to teacher shortage.

Similarly, the 2009 United States Department of Education program Race to the Top, designed to spur reform in K-12 Education, and awarding $4.35 billion in funds, has been controversial for its emphasis on testing to evaluate schools, an approach which contrasts positive schooling techniques, and data regarding its effectiveness has yet to be produced.

Besides the emphasis on standardized testing to evaluate school performance, tracking has been a very controversial, yet widely implemented, approach to learning in America's public schools. Tracking is an approach which places children in classes according to expectation levels. Honors, college-preparation, Advanced Placement, and International Baccalaureate classes are examples of higher-level learning courses, while schools may simultaneously offer regular-level classes for other students. Research has shown a disparity in the enrollment of these classes based on race. Research also shows that while separation by tracking is beneficial for higher-level students, it produces no benefit for lower-level students, and is possibly even detrimental to their academic success. Many advocates for education reform discount tracking based on the argument that a rigorous, quality education should be provided universally through public schools.

== Applications ==
Recently, a positive psychology plan was implemented in the U.S. military to address the high rates of post-traumatic stress disorder, depression, and other mental disorders among soldiers. The military asked psychologists to devise some sort of way not simply to treat the problem but to prevent future soldiers from becoming vulnerable to these mental disorders. Statistically, there is a normal distribution of reactions to combat in the military: the left side includes those who have trouble and end up suffering from a mental disorder, the middle, those who are resilient and return to normal functioning afterwards, and the right are those who bounce back to an even higher level of functioning and experience growth through adversity. The goal of the plan is to have a negatively skewed distribution that shifts most soldiers to the right side of this distribution. The model is designed to improve one's spiritual, emotional, social, and family fitness. If the plan is successful within the military, it could possibly revolutionize current U.S. civilian health care and be a new model for the education system. Within health care, it will emphasize prevention, rather than solely treatment; additionally, within schools, it will encourage psychological fitness similar to the plan used for the military.

"Positive education benefits the teacher, too. It is easier to engage with students and persist in the work they need to do master their academic material (Fisher, 2015). It creates a school culture that is caring, trusting, and it prevents problem behavior. In relation to achievement goals, expectancy beliefs, and value it is found that task goals associated positively with optimism resulted in a highly motivated student (Fadlelmula, 2010). Research has shown that motivation may be consistent and long-term if it is always paired with positive psychology interventions."

Additionally, the effects of positive learning were examined in the context of medical school and first-year physicians. Often, medical students and young physicians get exhausted and burnt out from the stressful conditions they operate under. Medical students at Karolinska Institutet were evaluated in their final year of school and again in their first year as a physician. After controlling for baseline exhaustion, a positive learning climate in the clinic that the students were working in was found to have a negative correlation with exhaustion. In this case, positive learning was found to predict the exhaustion of students and new doctors. Although only a correlation, positive learning environments could benefit the well-being of people with various other careers and job conditions.

== See also ==
- Circle of courage
- Comprehensive sex education
- Culture and positive psychology
- Jigsaw (teaching technique)
- Positive Behavior Interventions and Supports
- Positive behavior support
- Positive psychology
- Positive youth development
- Progressive education
