= Drew Denbaum =

American writer, actor and director

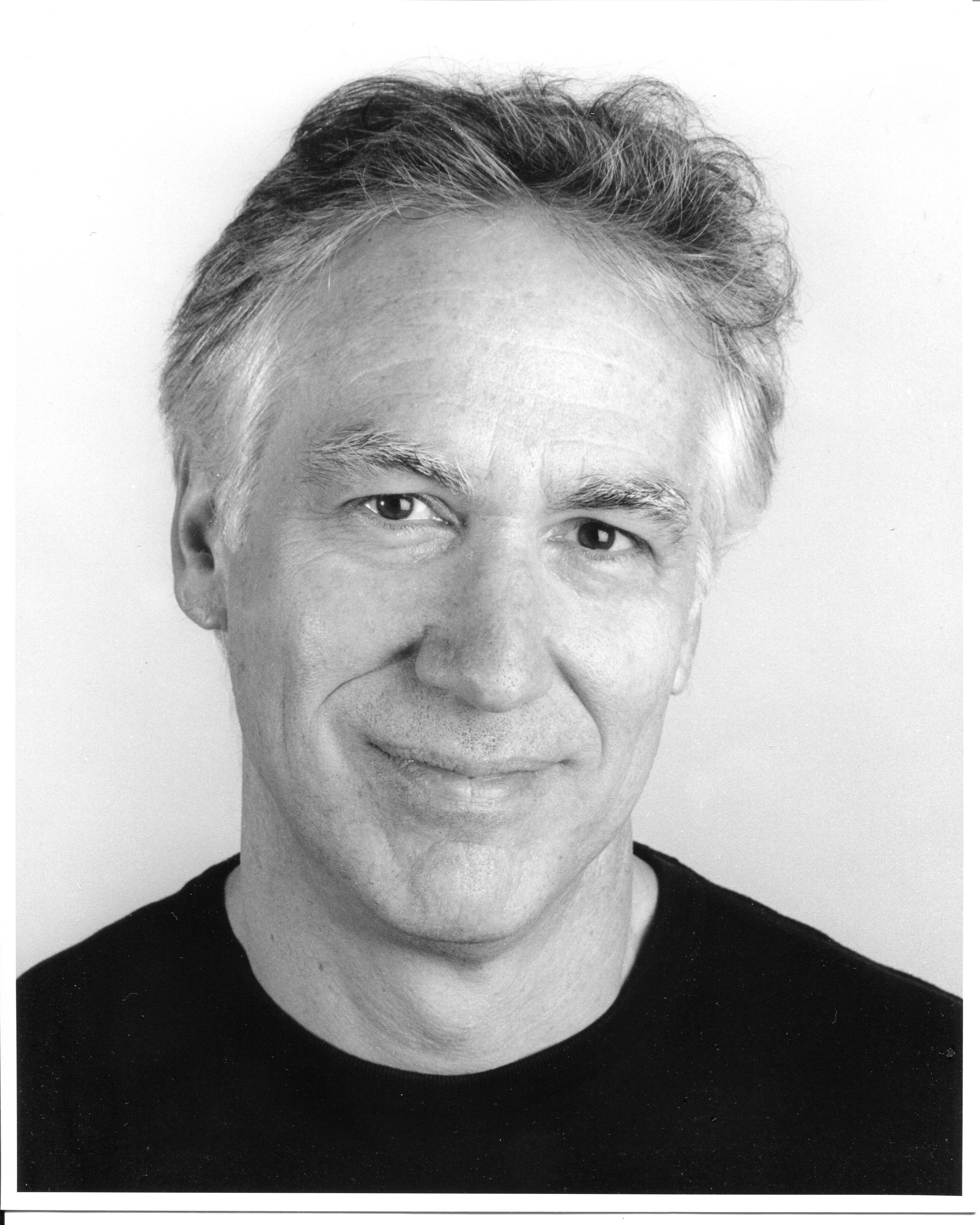
- Denbaum in 2005
- Born: Drew Steven Denbaum; December 12, 1949 (age 76); Brooklyn, New York, US
- Education: Yale University (BA); Sacred Heart University (MA)

Drew Denbaum (born December 12, 1949, in Brooklyn, New York) is an American writer, actor, director, and educator, with credits in theater, film, and television.

== Early life and career ==
Denbaum graduated cum laude with honors from The Lawrenceville School (1967) and Yale University (1971), where he was awarded the Saybrook Fellows' Prize and was close friends with the author and critic, William A. Henry III, and the poet and psychologist, Steve Benson.

== Theater ==
Denbaum's playwriting credits include Ways of Loving and Secrets, both based on stories by Brendan Gill and produced in New York City at West Park Theater and Stage 73. Denbaum's play, The Last of Wilhelm Reich was developed at Theatre Artists Workshop after more than a decade of research on the controversial psychoanalyst, scientist, and social activist, Wilhelm Reich.

Denbaum's directing credits in the theater include Hatful of Rain by Michael V. Gazzo at the Samuel Beckett Theatre, The Poet and the Rent by David Mamet at the Henry Street Settlement Theatre, and Secrets at Stage 73, all in New York City. Notable theater performances by Denbaum include Marat in Marat/Sade by Peter Weiss, directed by Lynne Meadow; Uriah in Mann ist Mann by Bertolt Brecht, directed by Evangeline Morphos; Sir Andrew Aguecheek in Shakespeare's Twelfth Night, directed by Leland Starnes; Wilhelm Reich in The Last of Wilhelm Reich, directed by Denbaum; and August Strindberg in Strindberg's Dollhouse by Vivian Sorvall, directed by Mark Graham.

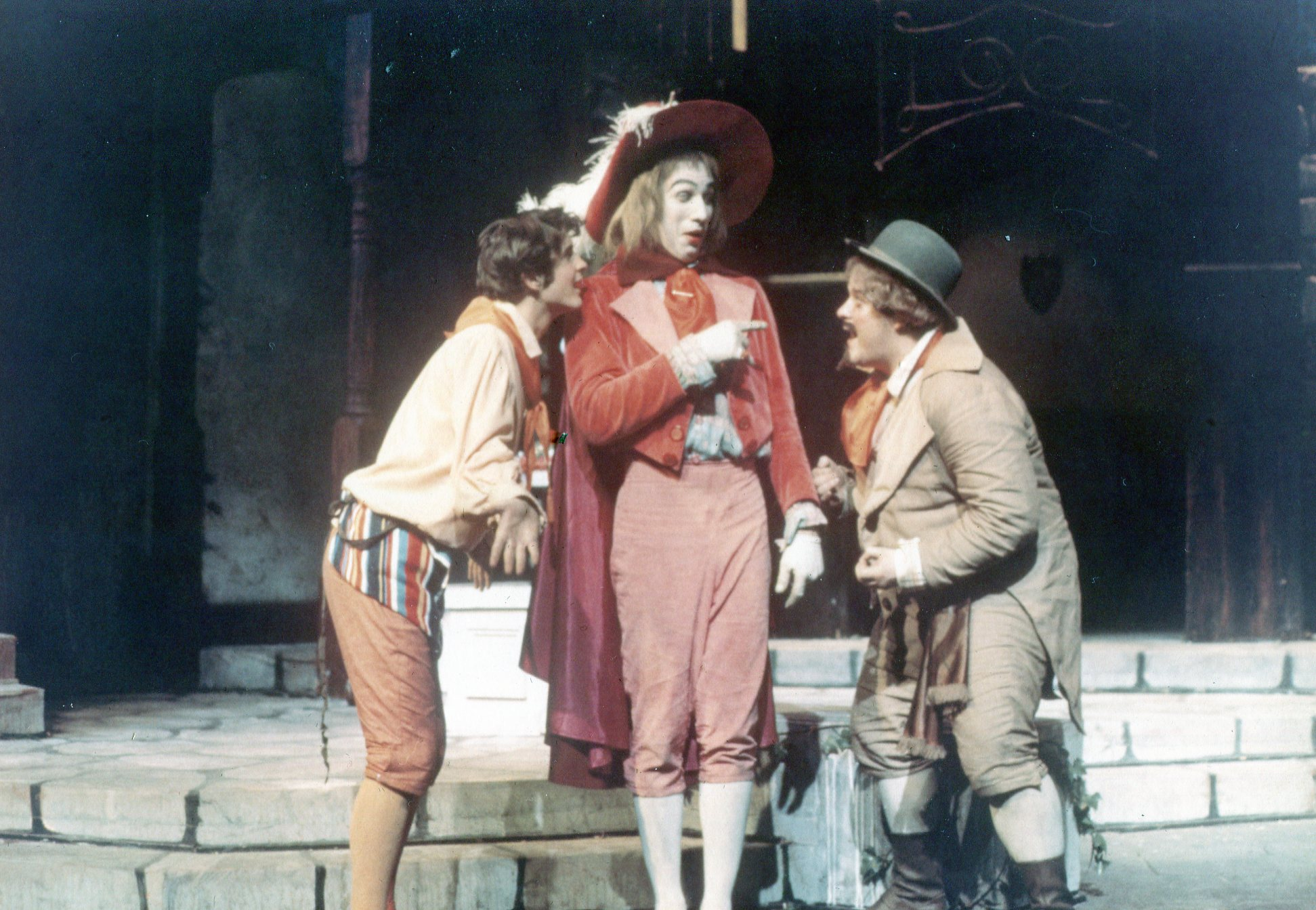
Drew Denbaum as Sir Andrew Aguecheek in a production of "Twelfth Night," directed by Leland Starnes at Yale in 1968.

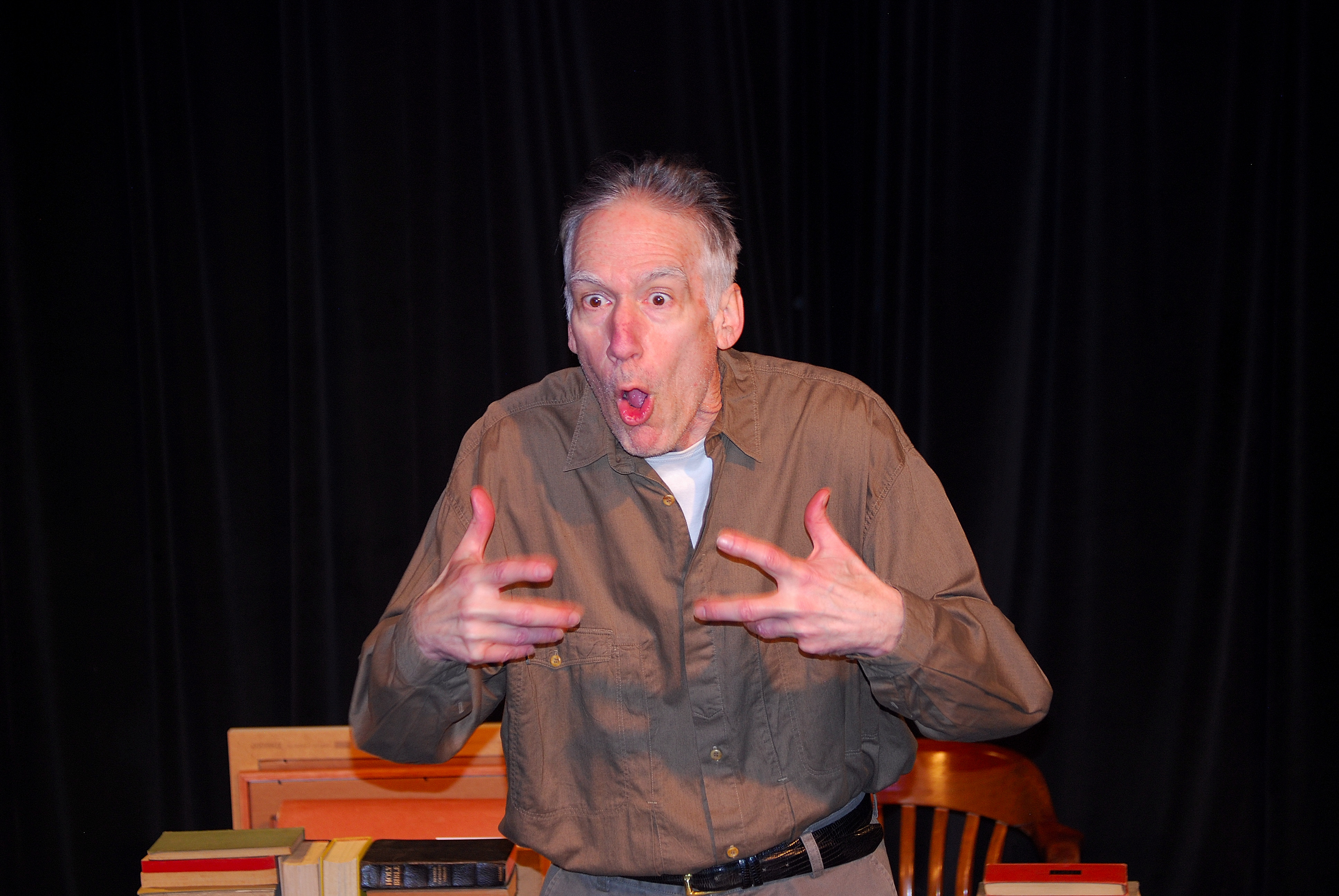
Drew Denbaum as Wilhelm Reich in "The Last of Wilhelm Reich" at Theatre Artists Workshop (Norwalk, CT), 2014

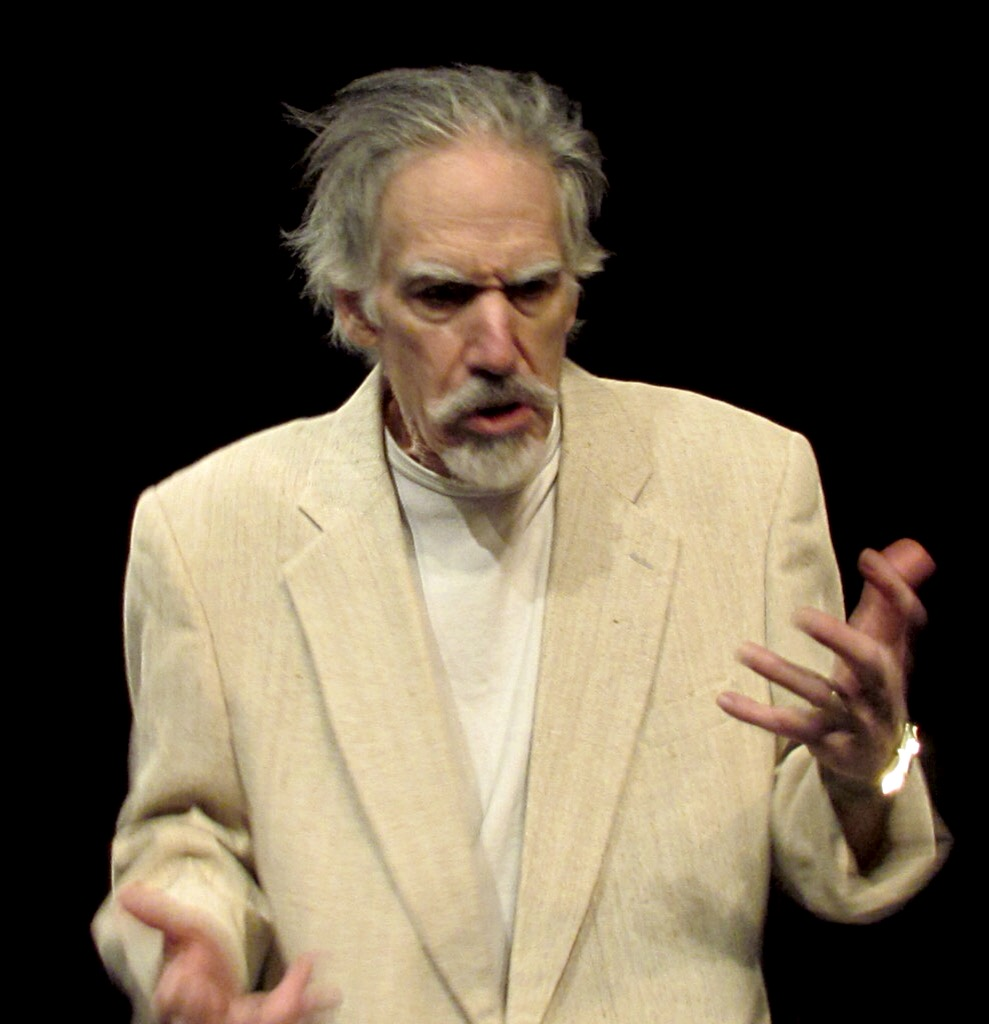
Drew Denbaum as August Strindberg in "Strindberg's Dollhouse" at Theatre Artists Workshop, 2015. Vanessa David, Photographer.

== Film ==
Denbaum began his film career as a story analyst at Columbia Pictures and joined Cannon Films as assistant to the President in Charge of Production, Christopher C. Dewey. Denbaum was Associate Producer of the feature films, Jump!, directed by Joe Manduke, and Who Killed Mary What'sername?, directed by Ernest Pintoff. While attending the Institute of Film and Television at New York University, Denbaum won First Prize in the 20th Century Fox Screenwriting Competition in 1975 for his original screenplay, Caught in the Act, about the Bay of Pigs invasion by the Central Intelligence Agency. Denbaum's next screenplay was the science fiction dark comedy, The Sky is Falling, developed by director John G. Avildsen for Universal Pictures.

In 1983, Denbaum adapted and directed John Gardner's novel Nickel Mountain as a feature film, which was released by Warner Bros./Lorimar. His short films, Lovesick (starring Austin Pendleton) and The Last Straw (based on the play by Charles Dizenzo), were featured in the New York Museum of Modern Art's Cineprobe Series and won awards in numerous film festivals, including the Silver Plaque at the Chicago Film Festival and the Grand Prize at the Virgin Islands International Film Festival.

== Television ==
Denbaum wrote the scripts for two television movies, I-75 (CBS) and The Westport Women's Bank Heist & Frolic (NBC). As an actor, he appeared in Barnaby Jones as Stan Nesbit in the episode Dangerous Gambit and in Cannon as Bill in the episode The Quasar Kill. Denbaum also appeared on Saturday Night Live as the husband of Gilda Radner in the classic commercial spoof, Royal Deluxe II, which also featured Dan Aykroyd and Garrett Morris, and was written by Al Franken and Tom Davis.

== Author ==
After decades of practicing Jain meditation, Denbaum co-authored the nonfiction book, Chi Fitness, with his wife, the dancer/choreographer, Sue S. Benton. Their book, influenced by the works of Moshé Feldenkrais, Gary Zukav, Carolyn Myss, and studies of the chakra energy system, was published by HarperCollins in 2001.

== Educator ==
In 2007, Denbaum earned a Master of Teaching degree and Connecticut certification (English, Grades 7–12) from Sacred Heart University and began teaching high school students in English, Film Studies, and Dramatic Literature and Performance, heavily influenced by the progressive education theories of Ken Robinson and Native American Circle of Courage principles. In 2010, he began teaching Literature and Composition at Housatonic Community College, where he was elected to the College Senate in 2014. In 2015, Denbaum joined the English Department of Westhill High School in Stamford, Connecticut. In 2017, Denbaum was named Director of the Stamford YMCA LEAD College and Career Readiness Summer Institute, an enrichment program for teenagers that includes classroom sessions at the Stamford campus of the University of Connecticut and briefings at corporate, cultural, and educational institutions, as well as trips to New York City and Washington, D.C. In keeping with his pedagogical focus on higher-order critical thinking, Denbaum expanded the LEAD After-School Program at Westhill High School by creating the first high school curriculum based on Thinking, Fast and Slow by the noted psychologist Daniel Kahneman, winner of the Nobel Prize in Economics. In 2019, Denbaum received the Stamford Public Education Foundation Spotlight Award for Excellence in Teaching. In 2020, he received the CT Board of Regents Adjunct Faculty Teaching Award, and in 2022, he was a Stamford Public Schools Teacher of the Year Finalist. In 2023, Denbaum conducted academic research in Kyoto, Japan as the recipient of a Fund for Teachers Fellowship, and in 2024, he taught a series of seminars on solving human rights problems to students from China, India, Mexico, Peru, Colombia, Brazil, and Chile in the Eduexplora program at Yale University.

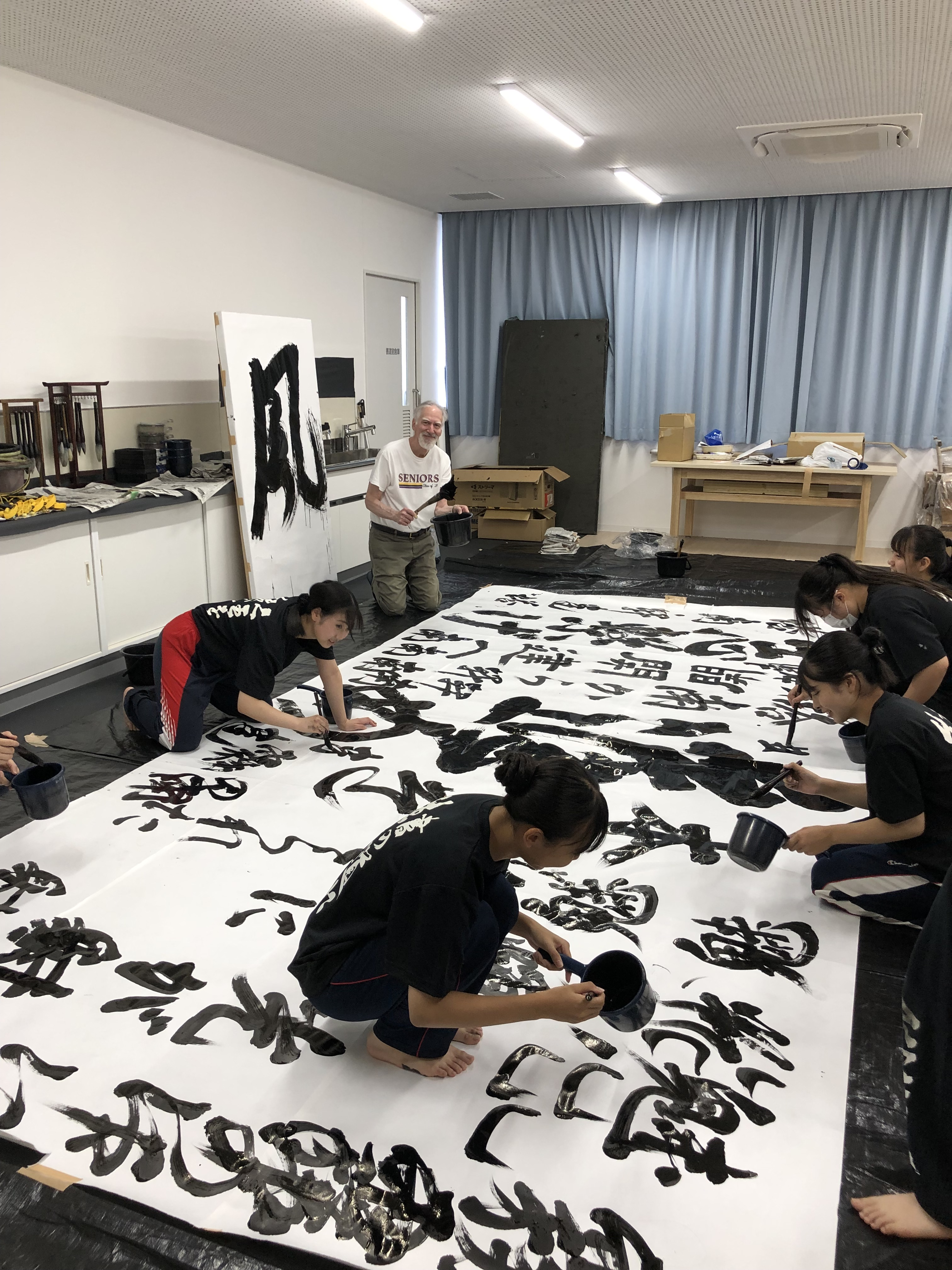
Denbaum with students at Kyoto Municipal Kaiken High School, 2023.

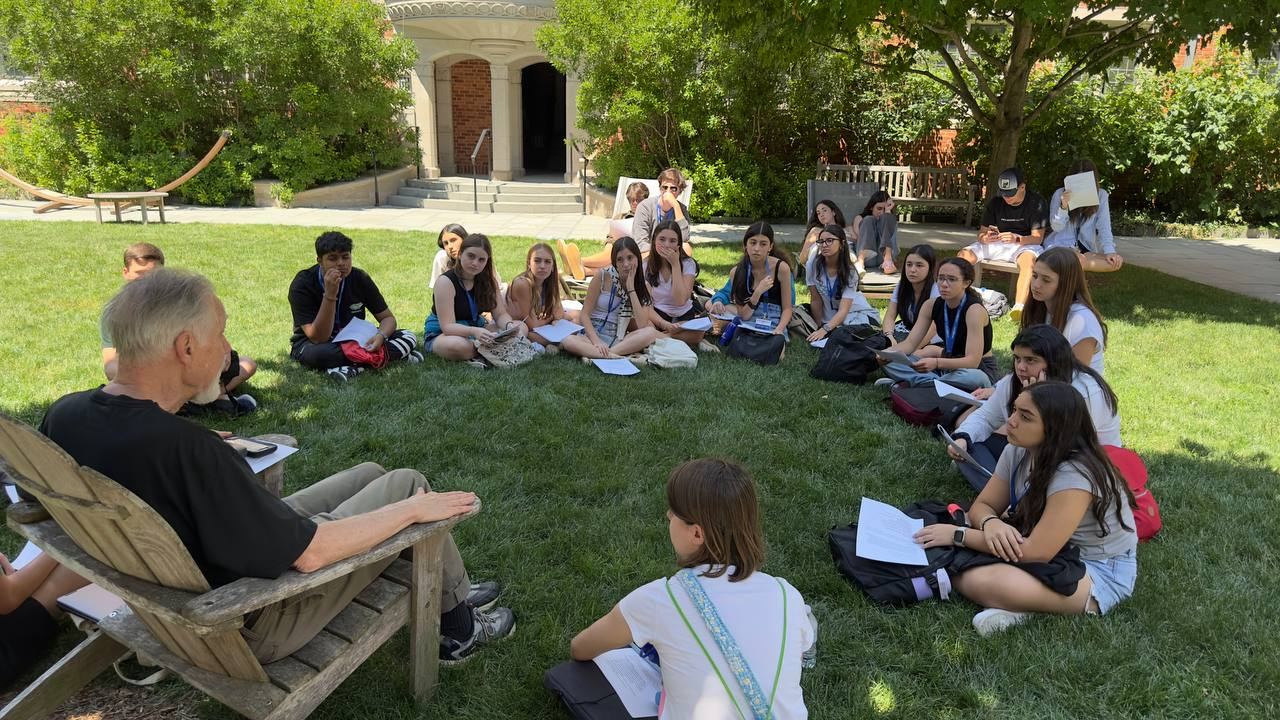
Denbaum teaches Eduexplora students at Yale, 2024.
