= Larry Brendtro =

American author

Larry K. Brendtro is the author of 16 books and over 200 articles in the field of positive youth development and trains youth professionals worldwide. He formerly was president of Starr Commonwealth, serving troubled youth in Michigan and Ohio, and has been a professor in the area of children's behavior disorders. His youth advocacy efforts include service as a practitioner member of the United States Coordinating Council on Juvenile Justice and Delinquency Prevention during the administrations of Presidents Clinton, Bush, and Obama. Brendtro is a licensed psychologist and director of Resilience Resources, Lennox, South Dakota, providing research, publication, and training in collaboration with CF Learning a program of Cal Farley's of Amarillo, Texas.

== Personal ==
Brendtro is a native of South Dakota. He married Janna (Agena) in 1973 and they are parents of three grown children. The couple currently resides in Lennox, South Dakota.

== Education ==
Brendtro obtained his BA from Augustana College (now Augustana University), a master's degree from South Dakota State University, and a PhD from the University of Michigan in the Combined Program in Education and Psychology.

== Professional history ==
Brendtro is professor emeritus of Special Education in the field of behavior disorders at Augustana University and previously taught at the University of Illinois and Ohio State University. For fourteen years, Brendtro was president of Starr Commonwealth in Michigan and Ohio, serving troubled children and their families through residential, community, and educational programs. In 1990, he and Augustana faculty colleagues Martin Brokenleg and Steve Van Bockern co-authored Reclaiming Youth at Risk: Our Hope for the Future. That research identified traditional Native American practices for rearing children in environments of respect with core values of belonging, mastery, independence, and generosity. These were portrayed in Native images by Lakota artist George Bluebird in a medicine wheel called the Circle of Courage. A quarter century of subsequent publications by Brendtro and colleagues have used the principle of consilience as the standard of evidence, integrating these values with best practices, natural science, and social science. A doctoral dissertation by sociologist William Jackson documents how these four core values (or their synonyms) are foundations of most key models of childhood socialization and positive youth development research. In psychological terms, these values are grounded in universal, brain-based growth needs or motivational drives for attachment, achievement, autonomy, and altruism.

In 2015, Brendtro joined in a collaboration with CF Learning to produce strength-based publications and training curricula in the Model of Leadership and Service. This model contends that meeting growth needs applies not only to young people but equally to those who operate in leadership and service roles, creating the relationships and environments where children can flourish. Drawing on emerging research on neuroscience, trauma, and positive psychology, this model identifies two additional needs or drives that motivate behavior, namely safety and adventure. Safety is the foundation for healing trauma; adventure is the elixir that transforms surviving into thriving. A new training curriculum, The Drive to Thrive, presents this six-factor model of positive development portrayed as a resilience compass.

Brendtro and colleagues have authored numerous books and publications on building environments where all young people thrive. These evidence-based principles are being employed in education, treatment, juvenile justice, social service, youth development, and faith-based settings as described in a recent book with contributions from over 30 international leaders in transforming children, families, communities, and organizations. These concepts inform school and justice reform, the transition from deficit to strength-based treatment, and democratic models of organizational leadership. Brendtro has trained professionals in over 25 countries and dozens of indigenous communities.

A wide range of training curricula have emerged from the movement sparked by Reclaiming Youth at Risk. Martin Brokenleg has trained hundreds of indigenous groups across North America. Co-author of Reclaiming Youth at Risk Steve Van Bockern identifies the powerful essentials for engaging youth in Schools that Matter training for educators. Larry Brendtro with Lesley du Toit of South Africa developed Response Ability Pathways (RAP) to enable all who work with youth to respond to needs rather than react to problems. Scott Larson has developed faith-based training within the juvenile justice system. Extending the evidence-based positive peer culture model, Cultures of Respect (COR), authored by Erik Laursen of Denmark provides training for adult leaders and professionals responsible for creating prosocial climates with and among youth in schools, group work, and justice settings. Parents and caregivers have the primary impact on development and New Zealand educators Deborah Espiner and Diane Guild have developed Rolling with Resilience (RwR) training for strengthening family relationships. Howard Bath from Australia teamed with John Seita to pilot Helping Kids Who Hurt which provides educators and direct care workers with practical strategies for turning trauma into resilience. J.C. Chambers and Mark Freado developed The Art of Kid Whispering which provides strategies for understanding and connecting with challenging youth who engage in self-defeating behavior. A team of professionals in the reclaiming movement have developed Planning Restorative Outcomes (PRO) which is a model of strength-based assessment.

== Books authored ==
Deep Brain Learning: Evidence-Based Essentials in Education, Treatment, and Youth Development by Larry Brendtro and Martin Mitchell, 2015 Starr Commonwealth

Deep Brain Learning: Pathways to Potential with Challenging Youth by Larry K. Brendtro, Martin L. Mitchell, and Herman J. McCall, 2009 Circle of Courage Institute and Starr Commonwealth

The Resilience Revolution: Discovering Strengths in Challenging Kids by Larry K. Brendtro and Scott J. Larson, 2006 Solution Tree

RAP: Response Ability Pathways: Restoring Bonds of Respect by Larry Brendtro and Lesley du Toit, 2005 Circle of Courage

Reclaiming our Prodigal Sons and Daughters: A Practical Approach for Connecting with Youth in Conflict by Scott Larson and Larry Brendtro, 2003 Solution Tree

Troubled Children and Youth: Turning Problems into Opportunities by Larry Brendtro and Mary Shahbazian, 2003 Research Press (IL)

Kids Who Outwit Adults, John R Seita, Larry Brendtro, 2002 Sopris West

No Disposable Kids by Larry Brendtro, Arlin E. Ness, Martin Mitchell and Starr Commonwealth, 2001 Sopris West

Reclaiming Youth at Risk: Our Hope for the Future by Larry K. Brendtro, Martin Brokenleg, Steve Van Bockern, National Education Service 1992

Re-educating Troubled Youth: Environments for Teaching and Treatment by Larry K. Brendtro and Arlin E. Ness, 1983 Aldine Transaction

Positive Peer Culture by Harry H. Vorrath and Larry K. Brendtro, 1974 Aldine Transaction

The Other 23 Hours: Child-Care Work with Emotionally Disturbed Children in a Therapeutic Milieu by Albert Trieschman, James Whittaker, and Larry Brendtro, 1969 Aldine Transaction
