= Nickel Mountain =

- VHS cover art
- Directed by: Drew Denbaum
- Written by: Drew Denbaum; John Gardner (novel)
- Produced by: Jakob Magnusson
- Starring: Michael Cole; Heather Langenkamp; Patrick Cassidy
- Cinematography: David Bridges
- Edited by: Bob Jenkis
- Music by: Lincoln Mayorga
- Distributed by: ZIV International, Warner Bros./Lorimar
- Release date: 1984
- Running time: 88 min.
- Countries: United States; Iceland
- Language: English

Nickel Mountain is a 1984 drama film produced in Iceland and the United States written and directed by Drew Denbaum. It stars Michael Cole, Heather Langenkamp, Patrick Cassidy, Grace Zabriskie, and Brian Kerwin. The film is based on the novel of the same title by American novelist John Gardner.

== Plot ==
Henry Soames owns a rural diner, and has befriended Willard Freud and Callie Wells. One day Willard and Callie get the news that Callie is pregnant, and Willard leaves her. Henry takes in Callie, and helps her through the pregnancy. They fall in love and get married. All is going well until Willard is back from the road and wants the baby.

== Cast ==
- Michael Cole as Henry Soames
- Heather Langenkamp as Callie Wells
- Patrick Cassidy as Willard Freund
- Brian Kerwin as George
- Grace Zabriskie as Ellie Wells
- Don Beddoe as Doc Cathey
- Ed Lauter as W.D. Freund
- Cotter Smith as Trucker
- Harry Northup as Frank
- Julia Montgomery as Delivery Nurse
- Liz Sheridan as Reception Nurse
- Peter Hobbs as Dr. Costard

== Release ==
The film had a limited release in Tulsa, Oklahoma.

=== Home video release ===
Nickel Mountain was released to videotape in the mid 1980s.
