= Martin Brokenleg =

American psychologist

The Reverend Martin Brokenleg
- Other name: Martin Kelsey Brokenleg

Ecclesiastical career
- Religion: Christianity (Anglican)
- Church: Episcopal Church (United States)
- Ordained: 1971

Academic background
- Education: South Dakota State University; Episcopal Divinity School; University of South Dakota
- Thesis: Sioux American Indian and White Children (1983)

Academic work
- Discipline: Native American studies
- Institutions: Augustana College; Vancouver School of Theology
- Notable ideas: Circle of Courage
- Website: martinbrokenleg.com

Martin Kelsey Brokenleg is a psychologist and author in the fields of trauma, resilience, and Native American studies. An enrolled member of the Rosebud Sioux Tribe, he was a professor of Native American studies at Augustana University in South Dakota for 30 years. He also served as professor and director of the native ministries programme at the Vancouver School of Theology from 2004 to 2009.

Brokenleg is known for the Circle of Courage, an influential model of positive youth development first presented by Brokenleg and Larry Brendtro in 1988. The framework posits that there are four universal needs and values that are essential for young people's growth: belonging, mastery, independence, and generosity. The model has been widely used in educational, treatment, and youth work settings and received the Albert E. Trieschman award for contribution to the child and youth care literature.
