= Tootling =

Reporting of only positive, rather than inappropriate, social behaviors

Tootling is a classroom-based intervention used to increase peer prosocial behaviors, particularly offering and receiving help, while decreasing negative and disruptive peer interactions. Tootling is like tattling but refers to the reporting of only positive, rather than inappropriate, social behaviors. The idea behind this concept is if young children can learn to tattle on inappropriate behavior, then they are capable of monitoring and reporting prosocial behavior.

The objective of tootling is to get students to engage in more prosocial behaviors and to be aware and appreciative of these behaviors in others. Tootling is also helpful for teachers to foster awareness of positive behaviors and increase praise while downplaying a focus on negative behaviors and punishment. The word "tootling" is a combination of "tattling" (monitoring and reporting classmates antisocial behavior) and the expression "tooting your own horn". Tootling meets key criteria for classroom-based positive behavior support (PBS) and can be used in general and special education settings. In addition, tootling was considered a best practice strategy for special education instructors for providing an inclusive classroom.

== Process ==
1. The tootling process begins with a group training session to teach students how to appropriately report positive peer behaviors. Students are not allowed to report on their own behaviors. They are given clear examples of tootling and then asked to give their own examples. At this point, the teacher or trainer offers feedback and/or reinforcement. Students are then given index cards that will be taped to their desks and used to record tootles. A correct "tootle" states a) the name of the "helper" b) the name of the "helpee" c) a description of the observed prosocial behavior. A group feedback chart is created, to count the cumulative number of tootles, and a group reward or reinforcer (typically an activity) is chosen.
2. At the beginning of each school day, the students are given an index card that is then taped to the desk. Students quietly record any observations of peers helping peers seen throughout the day. If a student fills an entire card, he/she can turn it in for a new card. At the end of the day, students hand in their cards. The teacher then counts the tootles, only counting helping behaviors, and fills in the feedback chart. If the same instance is recorded multiple times, they all count. The next day, the teacher announces the number of tootles recorded and may read some examples aloud and offer praise. Once the set number of tootles is reached, the class earns the group reward.
3. After the goal is met, this process can be repeated. Some alterations may be to make the tootle criteria more difficult or stringent or to choose a new group reward. It is encouraged to get suggestions from students for group rewards and to choose them randomly to ensure reinforcement for as many students as possible.

== See also ==
- Community psychology
- Developmental psychology
- School psychology
