= Positive behavior support =

Form of applied behavior analysis

Positive behavior support (PBS) uses tools from applied behaviour analysis and values of normalisation and social role valorisation theory to improve quality of life, in schools and for individuals with learning/intellectual disabilities. PBS uses functional analysis to understand what maintains an individual's challenging behavior and how to support the individual to get these needs met in a more appropriate way, instead of using 'challenging behaviours'. People's inappropriate behaviors are difficult to change because they are functional; they serve a purpose for them (sensory needs, attachment/attention, escape or tangible). These behaviors may be supported by reinforcement in the environment.

Positive Reinforcement Adding something pleasant to increase a behavior.

How it works: After a desired behavior, you give a reward (something the person wants).

Goal: The pleasant consequence motivates the person to repeat the behavior.

Negative Reinforcement

Removing something unpleasant to increase a behavior.

How it works: After the desired behavior, something unpleasant stops or is taken away.

Goal: The relief encourages the behavior to happen again.

Examples:

Taking painkillers removes a headache

Negative reinforcement is not punishment. It strengthens behavior by taking away discomfort; punishment reduces behavior.

The positive behavior support process involves identifying goals, then undertaking functional behavior assessment (FBA). FBAs clearly describe behaviors, identify the contexts (events, times, and situation) that predict when behavior will and will not occur, and consequences that maintain the behavior. The FBA includes a hypothesis about the behavior and data for a baseline. This informs the support plan design, implementation and monitoring of the plan.

Positive behavior support is increasingly being recognized as a strategy that is feasible, desirable, and effective. For example, teachers and parents need strategies they are able and willing to use and that affect the child's ability to participate in community and school activities.

By changing stimulus and reinforcement in the environment and teaching the person to strengthen deficit skill areas, their behavior changes. In schools, this can allow students to be included in the general education setting.

Three areas of skill deficits addressed by PBS are communication skills, social skills, and self-management skills. Re-directive therapy as positive behavior support is especially effective in the parent–child relationship. Where other treatment plans have failed, re-directive therapy allows for a positive interaction between parents and children. Positive behavior support is successful in the school setting because it is primarily a teaching method.

== In U.S. schools ==
Schools are required to conduct functional behavioral assessment (FBA) and use positive behavior support with students who are identified as disabled and are at risk for expulsion, alternative school placement, or more than 10 days of suspension. Even though FBA is required under limited circumstances it is good professional practice to use a problem-solving approach to managing problem behaviors in the school setting.

The use of positive behavior interventions and supports (PBIS) in schools is widespread in part because it is a professional skill in early special education programs (as opposed to Rogerian counseling). The program offers a primary, secondary, and tertiary level of intervention. A basic tenet of the PBIS approach includes identifying students in one of three categories – primary, secondary, or tertiary Interventions are specifically developed for each of these levels with the goal of reducing the risk for academic or social failure. The interventions become more focused and complex at each level.

Primary prevention strategies focus on interventions used on a school-wide basis for all students. PBS use for other than a designated population group has neither been approved by the professions or the public-at-large. This level of prevention is considered "primary" because all students are exposed in the same way, and at the same level, to the intervention. Approximately 80–85% of students who are not at risk for behavior problems respond in a positive manner to this prevention level. Primary prevention strategies include, but are not limited to, using effective teaching practices and curricula, explicitly teaching behavior that is acceptable within the school environment, focusing on ecological arrangement and systems within the school, consistent use of precorrection procedures, using active supervision of common areas, and creating reinforcement systems that are used on a school-wide basis.

Secondary prevention strategies involve around 10–15% of the school population who do not respond to the primary prevention strategies and are at risk for academic failure or behavior problems but are not in need of individual support. Interventions at the secondary level often are delivered in small groups to maximize time and effort and should be developed with the unique needs of the students within the group. Examples of these interventions include social support such as social skills training (e.g., explicit instruction in skill-deficit areas, friendship clubs, check in/check out, role playing) or academic support. Additionally, secondary programs could include behavioral support approaches (e.g., simple Functional Behavioral Assessments [FBA], precorrection, self-management training).

Even with the heightened support within secondary level interventions, some students (1–7%) will need the additional assistance at the tertiary level.Tertiary prevention programs focus on students who display persistent patterns of disciplinary problems. Tertiary-level programs are also called intensive or individualized interventions and are the most comprehensive and complex. The interventions within this level are strength-based in that the complexity and intensity of the intervention plans directly reflect the complexity and intensity of the behaviors. Students within the tertiary level continue involvement in primary and secondary intervention programs and receive additional support as well. These supports could include use of full FBA, de-escalation training for the student, heightened use of natural supports (e.g., family members, friends of the student), and development of a Behavior Intervention Plan (BIP).

Although comprehensive services are important for all students, a critical aspect of the three-tiered model is the identification of students at one of the three levels. One method of identifying students in need of interventions is to analyze office disciplinary referrals (ODR) taken at the school. ODRs may be a means of both identifying students' risk level for antisocial behavior and school failure. Researchers have advocated analyzing this naturally occurring data source as a relatively cheap, effective, and ongoing measurement device for PBS programs.

ODRs have also been shown to be effective in determining where students fall within a three-leveled model, developing professional development as well as helping coordinate school efforts with other community agencies, predicting school failure in older grades as well as delinquency, indicating types of behavior resulting in referrals, and determination of the effectiveness of precorrection techniques. Analyzing discipline referral data can also help school personnel identify where to improve ecological arrangements within a school and to recognize how to increase active supervision in common areas. A limitation of only using ODRs to measure behavior problems is that they have been found to be ineffective at measuring internalizing behavior problems such as anxiety, depression, and withdrawal.

== Functional behavior assessment ==
The procedure known as Functional Behavior Assessment (FBA) was adapted from applied behavior analysis (ABA) and is the cornerstone of a Positive Behavior Support plan. The assessment seeks to describe the behavior and environmental factors and setting events that predict the behavior in order to guide the development of effective support plans. The assessment lays the foundation for PBS and includes:

- a description of the problem behavior and its general setting of occurrence
- identification of events, times and situations that predict problem behavior
- identification of consequences that maintain behavior
- identification of the motivating function of behavior
- collection of direct observational data
- identification of alternative behavior that could replace the person's problem behavior (i.e., what a typical child or adult does). Often this is measured through direct observation or standardized behavioral assessment instruments.

The results of the assessment help in developing the individualized behavior support plan. This outlines procedures for teaching alternatives to the behavior problems, and redesign of the environment to make the problem behavior irrelevant, inefficient, and ineffective.

Behavior chain analysis is another avenue of functional behavior assessment, which is growing in popularity. In behavior chain analysis, one looks at the progressive changes of behavior as they lead to problem behavior and then attempts to disrupt this sequence. Whereas FBA is concerned mostly with setting-antecedent-behavior-consequence relations, behavior chain analysis looks at the progression of behavior. For example, a child may fidget at first, then begin to tease others, then start to throw things, and finally hit another student.

Critics of ABA and of ABA-based techniques such as FBA note disapprovingly that many applications of FBA, especially to autistic children, erroneously identify "getting 'stuck' in repetitive movements" as a "problem behavior" to be targeted for elimination rather than correctly recognizing it as non-harmful or even as a helpful self-administration of stimuli aiding in the person's neurological and emotional self-regulation.

== Behavioral strategies available ==
There are many different behavioral strategies that PBS can use to encourage individuals to change their behavior. Some of these strategies are delivered through the consultation process to teachers. The strong part of functional behavior assessment is that it allows interventions to directly address the function (purpose) of a problem behavior. For example, a child who acts out for attention could receive attention for alternative behavior (contingency management) or the teacher could make an effort to increase the amount of attention throughout the day (satiation). Changes in setting events or antecedents are often preferred by PBS because contingency management often takes more effort. Another tactic especially when dealing with disruptive behavior is to use information from a behavior chain analysis to disrupt the behavioral problem early in the sequence to prevent disruption. Some of the most commonly used approaches are:

- Modifying the environment or routine, using the three term contingency, particularly antecedents (such as curriculum), behavior, and/or consequences
- Providing an alternative to the undesired behavior (not the same as a reward; it should be an alternative that is readily available to the person. The thought behind this is that the person may, over time, learn to more independently seek out appropriate options rather than the undesired behavior(s)).
- Tactical ignoring of the behavior (also called extinction)
- Distracting the child
- Positive reinforcement for an appropriate behavior
- Changing expectations and demands placed upon the child
- Teaching the child new skills and behaviors
- Graded extinction and cognitive behavioral therapies (CBTs) such as desensitization
- Provide sensory based breaks to promote an optimal level of arousal and calming for increased use the replacement/alternative behavior
- Changing how people around the child react
- Time-out (child)
- Medication

== Behavior management program ==
The main keys to developing a behavior management program include:

- Identifying the specific behaviors to address
- Establishing the goal for change and the steps required to achieve it
- Procedures for recognizing and monitoring changed behavior
- Choosing the appropriate behavioral strategies that will be most effective.

Through the use of effective behavior management at a school-wide level, PBS programs offer an effective method to reduce school crime and violence. To prevent the most severe forms of problem behaviors, normal social behavior in these programs should be actively taught.

== Consequential management/contingency management ==
Consequential management is a positive response to challenging behavior. It serves to give the person informed choice and an opportunity to learn. Consequences must be clearly related to the challenging behavior. For example, if a glass of water was thrown and the glass smashed, the consequence (restitution) would be for the person to clean up the mess and replace the glass. These sorts of consequences are consistent with normal social reinforcement contingencies.

Providing choices is very important and staff can set limits by giving alternatives that are related to a behavior they are seeking. It is important that the alternative is stated in a positive way and that words are used which convey that the person has a choice. For example:

- Coercive approach – "If you don't cut that out you'll have to leave the room."
- Positive approach – "You can watch TV quietly or leave the room."

== Implementation on a school-wide level ==
School-Wide Positive Behavior Support (SW-PBS) consists of a broad range of systematic and individualized strategies for achieving important social and learning outcomes while preventing problem behavior with all students.

A measurable goal for a school may be to reduce the level of violence, but a main goal might be to create a healthy, respectful, and safe learning and teaching environment. PBS on a school-wide level is a system that can be used to create the "perfect" school, or at the very least a better school, particularly because before implementation it is necessary to develop a vision for what the school environment should look like in the future.

According to Horner et al. (2004), once a school decides to implement PBS, the following characteristics require addressing:

1. define 3 to 5 school-wide expectations for appropriate behavior;
2. actively teach the school-wide behavioral expectations to all students;
3. monitor and acknowledge students for engaging in behavioral expectations;
4. correct problem behaviors using a consistently administered continuum of behavioral consequences
5. gather and use information about student behavior to evaluate and guide decision making;
6. obtain leadership of school-wide practices from an administrator committed to providing adequate support and resources; and
7. procure district-level support.

Proponents state that such a program is able to create a positive atmosphere and culture in almost any school, but the support, resources, and consistency in using the program over time must be present.

== Australia ==
In Australia, PBS is the recommended approach to behavior support under the National Disability Insurance Scheme (NDIS). Specialist behavior support for NDIS participants is regulated by the NDIS Quality and Safeguards Commission under the National Disability Insurance Scheme (Restrictive Practices and Behaviour Support) Rules 2018. Behavior support practitioners must be assessed as suitable by the Commission, and that assessment is based on the Commission's Positive Behaviour Support Capability Framework. The framework was first prepared in 2019 by the Centre for Disability Studies, an affiliate of the University of Sydney, and has since been revised several times; version 5.0 was published in October 2026. Its stated aim is to strengthen safeguards for people receiving behavior support and to reduce and eliminate the use of restrictive practices. Updated suitability assessment processes apply to new practitioner applicants from 18 December 2026.

== See also ==
- Applied behavior analysis
- Behavior management
- Behavior modification
- Behavioral engineering
- Child time-out
- Contingency management
- Positive education
- Professional practice of behavior analysis
- Reinforcement
- Systematic desensitization
- Tootling

Alternatives to special education approaches (special populations):

- Family support
- Group home
- Inclusion (education)
- Normalization
- Social role valorization
- Supported housing
- Supported living
