= Prosocial behavior =

Intent to benefit others

Prosocial behavior is a social behavior that "benefit[s] other people or society as a whole", "such as helping, sharing, donating, co-operating, and volunteering". The person may or may not intend to benefit others; the behavior's prosocial benefits are often only calculable after the fact. (Consider: Someone may intend to 'do good' but the effects may be catastrophic.) Obeying the rules and conforming to socially accepted behaviors (such as stopping at a "Stop" sign or paying for groceries) are also regarded as prosocial behaviors. These actions may be motivated by culturally influenced value systems; empathy and concern about the welfare and rights of others; egoistic or practical concerns, such as one's social status or reputation, hope for direct or indirect reciprocity, or adherence to one's perceived system of fairness; or altruism, though the existence of pure altruism is somewhat disputed, and some have argued that this falls into the philosophical rather than psychological realm of debate. Evidence suggests that prosociality is central to the well-being of social groups across a range of scales, including schools. Prosocial behavior in the classroom can have a significant impact on a student's motivation for learning and contributions to the classroom and larger community. In the workplace, prosocial behavior can have a significant impact on team psychological safety, as well as positive indirect effects on employee's helping behaviors and task performance. Empathy is a strong motive in eliciting prosocial behavior, and has deep evolutionary roots.

Prosocial behavior fosters positive traits that are beneficial for children and society. It helps many beneficial functions by bettering production of any league and its organizational scale. Evolutionary psychologists use theories such as kin-selection theory and inclusive fitness as an explanation for why prosocial behavioral tendencies are passed down generationally, according to the evolutionary fitness displayed by those who engaged in prosocial acts. Encouraging prosocial behavior may also require decreasing or eliminating undesirable social behaviors.

Although the term "prosocial behavior" is often associated with developing desirable traits in children, the literature on the topic has grown since the late 1980s to include adult behaviors as well. The term "prosocial" has grown into a world-wide movement, using evolutionary science to create real-world pro-social changes from working groups to whole cultures.

== History ==
According to the psychology researcher Daniel Batson, the term "was created by social scientists as an antonym for antisocial."

The concept of prosocial behavior in psychology gained popularity in the 1970s. It was introduced to describe acts that promote positive social outcomes, such as cooperation and helping, and has since been examined through the lens of evolutionary biology, neuroscience, and cross-cultural psychology. Interest in prosocial behavior has deep historical roots, particularly within religious, philosophical, and psychological traditions.

== Reciprocity vs. altruism in motivation ==
The purest forms of prosocial behavior are motivated by altruism, an unselfish interest in helping another person. According to psychology professor John W. Santrock, the circumstances most likely to evoke altruism are empathy for an individual in need, or a close relationship between the benefactor and the recipient. However, many prosocial behaviors that appear altruistic are in fact motivated by the norm of reciprocity, which is the obligation to return a favor with a favor. People feel guilty when they do not reciprocate and they may feel angry when someone else does not reciprocate. Reciprocal altruism suggests that "such helping is driven by a genetic tendency". Thus some professionals argue that altruism may not exist, and is completely motivated by reciprocity. Either reciprocity or altruism may motivate many important prosocial behaviors, including sharing.

=== Types of Prosocial Behavior ===
- Altruism: Helping others with no expectation of reciprocation.
- Reciprocal altruism: Helping others with the expectation that the favor may be returned.
- Cooperation: Working together toward shared goals.
- Volunteering and charitable giving: Contributing time or resources to benefit others without compensation.

== Situational and individual factors ==
Prosocial behavior is mediated by both situational and individual factors.

=== Situational factors ===
One of the most common situation factors is the occurrence of the bystander effect. The bystander effect is the phenomenon that an individual's likelihood of helping decreases when passive bystanders are present in a critical situation. For example, when someone drops a stack of papers on a crowded sidewalk, most people are likely to continue passing him/her by. This example can be extended to even more urgent situations, such as a car crash or natural disaster. Bystanders are less likely to intervene as group size increases when surrounded by strangers, but they become more likely to help when accompanied by friends.

The decision model of bystander intervention noted that whether or not an individual gives aid in a situation depends upon their analysis of the situation. An individual will consider whether or not the situation requires their assistance, if the assistance is the responsibility of the individual, and how to help.

This model, proposed by professors Bibb Latané and John M. Darley, describes five things that must occur in order for a person to intervene:

1. Notice the situation
2. Construe it as an emergency.
3. Develop feelings of responsibility.
4. Believe they have skills to succeed.
5. Reach a conscious decision to help.

The number of individuals present in the situation requiring help is also a mediating factor in one's decision to give aid, where the more individuals are present, the less likely it is for one particular individual to give aid due to a reduction in perceived personal responsibility. This is known as diffusion of responsibility, where the responsibility one feels for the person(s) in need is divided by the number of bystanders. Another factor that comes into play is evaluation apprehension, which simply refers to the fear of being judged by other bystanders. Finally, pluralistic ignorance may also lead to someone not intervening. This refers to relying on the reaction of others, before reacting yourself.

Additionally, psychology professors John F. Dovidio, Jane Allyn Piliavin, and colleagues (1981) noted that individuals are likely to maximize their rewards and minimize their costs when determining whether or not to give aid in a situation – that is, that people are rationally self-motivated. Prosocial behavior is more likely to occur if the cost of helping is low (i.e. minimal time, or minimal effort), if helping would actually benefit the individual providing the help in some way, and if the rewards of providing the help are large. If it is in an individual's interest to help, they will most likely do so, especially if the cost of not providing the help is great.

People are also more likely to help those in their social group, or their "in group". With a sense of shared identity with the individual requiring assistance, the altruist is more likely to provide help, on the basis that one allocates more time and energy towards helping behavior within individuals of their own group. The labeling of another individual as a member of one's "in-group" leads to greater feelings of closeness, emotional arousal, and a heightened sense of personal responsibility for the other's welfare, all of which increase the motivation to act prosocially.

Researchers have also found that social exclusion decreases the likelihood of prosocial behavior occurring. In a series of seven experiments conducted in 2007 by Professor Jean M. Twenge and colleagues, researchers manipulated social inclusion or exclusion by telling research participants that other participants had purposefully excluded them, or that they would probably end up alone later in life. They found that this preliminary social exclusion caused prosocial behavior to drop significantly, noting that "Socially excluded people donated less money to a student fund, were unwilling to volunteer for further lab experiments, were less helpful after a mishap, and cooperated less in a mixed-motive game with another student." This effect is thought to be due to the fact that prosocial behavior, again, is motivated by a sense of responsibility in caring for and sharing resources with members of one's own group.

=== Individual factors ===
Individuals can be compelled to act pro-socially based on learning and socialization during childhood. Operant conditioning and social learning positively reinforces discrete instances of prosocial behaviors. Cognitive capacities like intelligence for example, are almost always related to prosocial likings. Helping skills and a habitual motivation to help others is therefore socialized, and reinforced as children understand why helping skills should be used to help others around them.

Social and individual standards and ideals also motivate individuals to engage in prosocial behavior. Social responsibility norms, and social reciprocity norms reinforce those who act prosocially. As an example, consider the child who is positively reinforced for "sharing" during their early childhood years. When acting prosocially, individuals reinforce and maintain their positive self-images or personal ideals, as well as help to fulfill their own personal needs. The correlation between a helper's state and helping tendencies are greatly restricted to the relationship between whoever takes part in the situation.

Emotional arousal is an additional important motivator for prosocial behavior in general. Batson's (1987) empathy-altruism model examines the emotional and motivational component of prosocial behavior. Feeling empathy towards the individual needing aid increases the likelihood that the aid will be given. This empathy is called "empathetic concern" for the other individual, and is characterized by feelings of tenderness, compassion, and sympathy.

Agreeableness is thought to be the personality trait most associated with inherent prosocial motivation. Prosocial thoughts and feelings may be defined as a sense of responsibility for other individuals, and a higher likelihood of experiencing empathy ("other-oriented empathy") both affectively (emotionally) and cognitively. These prosocial thoughts and feelings correlate with dispositional empathy and dispositional agreeableness.

==== Wealth ====
Subjective wealth correlated positively with all aspects of prosociality in a preregistered study of 80,337 people from 76 countries, representing 90% of global population. Objective wealth correlated positively with positive reciprocity, donating, volunteering, and helping strangers but negatively with trust. The results were highly consistent across the world, without any systematic variation.

==== Influence of Incentives ====
Behavioral experiments demonstrate that monetary incentives can influence prosocial behavior. Financial rewards tend to increase participation among those who lack intrinsic motivation. There are findings that suggested that prosocial and financial incentives may activate distinct motivations and encourage different types of posting behavior. Prosocial acts can be motivated by non‑material incentives, such as the emotional satisfaction of giving often referred to as the warm‑glow effect.

=== Other factors ===
In addition to situational and individualistic factors, there are some categorical characteristics that can impact prosocial behavior. Several studies have indicated a positive relationship between prosocial behavior and religion as well as social status. In addition, there may be sex differences in prosocial behavior, particularly as youths move into adolescence. Research suggests that while women and men both engage in prosocial behaviors, women tend to engage in more communal and relational prosocial behaviors whereas men tend to engage in more agentic prosocial behaviors. A recent study examining workplace charitable giving looked at the role of both sex and ethnicity. Results showed that women gave significantly more than men, and Caucasians gave significantly more than minority groups. However, the percent of minority individuals in the workplace was positively associated with workplace charitable giving by minorities. Culture, sex, and religion are important factors to consider in understanding prosocial behavior on an individual and group level.

== Developmental Trajectories ==
Prosocial behavior in childhood often begins with questions of sharing and fairness. From age 12–18 months, children begin to display prosocial behavior in presenting and giving their toys to their parents, without promoting or being reinforced by praise. The development of prosocial behavior continues throughout the second year of life, as children begin to gain a moral understanding of the world. As obedience to societal standards becomes important, children's ability to exhibit prosocial behavior strengthens, with occurrence and diversity of these behaviors increasing with age and cognitive maturity. What is important developmentally is that the child has developed a belief that sharing is an obligatory part of a social relationship and involves a question of right and wrong. So, as children move through childhood, their reasoning changes from being hedonistic and needs-oriented to becoming more concerned with approval and more involved in complex cognitive forms of perspective taking and reciprocity reasoning. Additionally, children's prosocial behavior is typically more centered around interest in friends and concern for approval, whereas adolescents begin to develop reasoning that is more concerned with abstract principles such as guilt and positive affect.

Parents can set examples that children carry into their interactions and communication with peers, but parents are not present during all of their children's peer exchanges. The day-to-day constructions of fairness standards is done by children in collaboration and negotiation with each other. Recent research demonstrates that invoking the self using subtle linguistic cues (e.g. identifying someone as a "helper" versus labeling the action, "helping") fosters the perception that a behavior reflects identity, and increases helping, or prosocial, behaviors in children significantly across tasks.

Another study by psychology professor Amélie Nantel-Vivier and colleagues (2009) used a multi-informant model to investigate the development of prosocial behaviour in both Canadian and Italian adolescents aged 10–15. Their findings have indicated that, in early adolescence, although empathy and moral reasoning continue to advance, the development of prosocial behaviors reaches a plateau. Theories for this change in development suggest that it is the result of more individualized and selective prosocial behaviors. During adolescence, youth begin to focus these behaviors toward their peer groups and/or affiliations. However, findings on the development of prosocial behavior vary across studies, likely due to differences in research methods.

Consistent with previous analyses, this study also found a tendency toward higher prosocial behaviors in young adolescent girls compared to their male classmates. The earlier maturation in females may be a possible explanation for this disparity. A more recent study that focused on the effects of pubertal timing found that early maturation in adolescents has a positive impact on prosocial behaviors. While their findings apply to both genders, this study found a much more pronounced effect in males. This suggests that earlier onset of puberty has a positive correlation with the development of prosocial behaviors.

In many Indigenous American communities, prosocial behavior is a valued means of learning and child rearing. Such behaviors are seen as contributing in an eagerly collaborative and flexible environment, aimed at teaching consideration, responsibility, and skills with the guidance and support of adults. Culturally valued developmental goals are integrally tied to children's participation in these contexts. It is also helpful for children to learn cultural mores in addition to individual personality development. Children learn functional life skills through real-time observation of adults and interactive participation of these learned skills within their community.

== In Education ==
Prosocial behavior can act as a strong motivator in education, for it provides students with a purpose beyond themselves and the classroom. This purpose beyond the self, or self-transcendence, is an innate human need to be a part of something bigger than themselves. When learning in isolation, the way Western academics are traditionally designed, students struggle to make connections to the material and its greater overarching purpose. This disconnection harms student learning, motivation, and attitudes about education.

If teachers make space for prosocial behavior in education and social learning, then they can illustrate that what students are learning will have a direct impact on the world that they live in. This would be considered a mutually constituting relationship, or a relationship in which both individuals and culture develop interdependently. In other words, what students are learning in a classroom could be intimately connected with a purpose towards a greater cause, deepening the learning itself.

Studies by Yeager et al. test the effects of having a self-transcendent purpose for learning, with the results showing that such a purpose for learning led to fewer future college dropouts, increased high school math and science GPAs, and persistence on boring tasks. This self transcendent purpose may not only encourage persistence on boring tasks, but may help to make boring tasks more meaningful and engaging.

A person's ideas and opinions are largely shaped by the world that they grow up in, which in turn determines what sort of change they want to instill in the world. For example: a girl who grew up in poverty becoming a social worker. The environment she grew up in gave her an awareness of the workings of poverty, motivating her to instill change in either the institutions that cause it, or help those affected by poverty.

There aren't many opportunities to make prosocial contributions in school; which makes school feel isolated and irrelevant. By encouraging students to find a self-transcendent purpose in their learning, others enable them to enjoy their learning and make connections to community contributions.

== In the workplace ==
Studies and meta-studies have shown an association between pro-social behaviour and successful outcomes for an organisation, such as increased profitability and shareholder value. The association holds true for pro-social behaviour on the part of both workers and bosses.

== Influences ==
=== Media programming and video games on children ===
Studies have shown that different types of media programming may evoke prosocial behaviors in children.

The channels aimed at younger viewers like Nickelodeon and Disney Channel had significantly more acts of altruism than the general-audience demographic channels like A&E and or TNT, according to one large-scale study. This study examined the programming of 18 different channels, including more than 2,000 entertainment shows, during a randomly selected week on television. The study revealed that nearly three quarters (73 percent) of programs contained at least one act of altruism and on average viewers saw around three acts of altruism an hour. Around one-third of those behaviors were explicitly rewarded in the plot, potentially sending the message that these acts of prosocial behavior can come with positive consequences.

Another study on the topic was conducted by University at Buffalo, Iowa State University and University of Minnesota professors. They studied children for two years for the purpose of investigating the role of media exposure on prosocial behavior for young boys and girls. The study concluded that media exposure could possibly predict outcomes related to prosocial behavior.

Other experimental research has suggested that prosocial video games may increase prosocial behavior in players although some of this work has proven difficult to replicate. However other scholars have been critical of this work for tending to falsely dichotomize video games into prosocial/violent categories despite significant overlap as well as methodological flaws in the experimental studies . For instance a study by Ferguson and Garza found that exposure to violent video games was associated with increased prosocial behavior, both on-line as well as volunteering in the real world. The authors speculated this may be due to the prosocial themes common in many violent games, as well as team oriented play in many games.

==== Legislation ====
In the United States, in an effort to get stations to air education and prosocial programming for children, the Children's Television Act was adopted in 1990. It states that channels must produce and air programming developed specifically for children as a condition to renew broadcast licenses. After discussions as to what the definition of "specifically designed for children" really means, in 1996 guidelines were passed to correct this ambiguity.

=== Arts ===
The arts are increasingly recognized as influential for health behaviors in strengthening social bonds and cohesion and promoting prosocial behavior. Evidence of the impact of different arts is emerging and research is growing on literature, movies and theatre. A review of current literature argues that performative arts are more prone to elicit empathic concern which is linked with more durable prosocial behavior during stressful situations such as the COVID-19 pandemic outbreak: in particular theatre and virtual reality are seen as promising. An active role of the arts in sustaining prosocial behavior should however integrate an ethical approach to avoid the risk of mass manipulation and intergroup bias.

=== Observation ===
People are generally much more likely to act pro-socially in a public setting rather than in a private setting. One explanation for this finding has to do with perceived status, being publicly recognized as a pro-social individual often enhance one's self-image and desirability to be considered for inclusion in social groups. Other research has shown that merely given people the "illusion" that they are being observed (e.g., by hanging up posters of "staring" human eyes) can generate significant changes in pro-social acts such as charitable giving and less littering. Pictures of human eyes trigger an involuntary neural gaze detection mechanism, which primes people to act pro-socially. There are two different forms of prosocial behaviors. Ordinary prosocial behavior requires "situational and sociocultural demands". Extraordinary prosocial behavior doesn't include as much. This indicates that one form is used for a more selfish result while the other is not.

== Perception of responsibility and guilt ==
Guilt has long been regarded as a motivator for prosocial behavior. Extensive data from a 2012 study conducted by de Hooge, demonstrates that when a secondary individual repairs a transgressors' damage caused to victims, the transgressors' guilt feelings, reparative intentions, and prosocial behavior drastically diminish. Thus, reduction of guilt may have more to do with reparative actions broadly, rather than necessarily prosocial behaviors taken on by oneself.

== Social media effects ==
Global use of social media is growing, especially among adolescent social media users. The negative effects of social media has been a large focus of scientific research; however, social media can also be a catalyst for prosocial behavior both online and offline. Social media is one of the most newly profound ways to spread awareness. Erreygers and colleagues define online prosocial behavior as "voluntary behavior carried out in an electronic context with the intention of benefitting particular others or promoting harmonious relations with others". Examples of online prosocial behavior include electronic donation of money to specific causes or the sharing of information and resources, such as in times of natural disaster.

One example of online prosocial behavior during natural disasters is the relief efforts in the wake of the 2011 Tōhoku earthquake and tsunami off the coast of Japan, when users turned to Facebook and Twitter to provide financial and emotional support via their social networks. Direct donations to Japanese relief were possible on The Red Cross fan page on Facebook, and via online discount sites like Groupon and LivingSocial.

== Emotional Influences on Prosocial Behavior ==
Mood and prosocial behavior are closely linked. People often experience the "feel good-do good" phenomena, where being in a good mood increases helping behaviors. Being in a good mood helps us to see the "good" in other people, and prolongs our own good mood. For example, mood and work behaviors have frequently been examined in research; studies show that positive mood at work is associated with more positive work-related behaviors (e.g., helping co-workers). Similarly, prosocial behaviors increase positive mood. Several studies have shown the benefits of volunteering and other prosocial behaviors on self-esteem, life satisfaction, and overall mental health. Additionally, negative mood can also impact prosocial behavior. Research has shown that guilt often leads to prosocial behaviors, whereas other negative mood states, such as fear, do not lead to the same prosocial behaviors.

A recent pilot study examined whether an intervention increasing prosocial behavior (kind acts) in young adults with social anxiety would both increase positive affect and decrease social anxiety in participants. Participants randomly assigned to a four-week Kind Acts intervention, where individuals were instructed to engage in three kind acts each day twice a week over the four-week period, showed both higher self-reported positive mood and increased satisfaction with relationships at the end of the intervention. This intervention demonstrates ways in which prosocial behavior may be beneficial in improving mood and mental health.

A meta-analysis from 2020 by Hui et al., which looked at 126 prior studies involving almost 200,000 participants, found that spontaneous instances of prosocial behavior, such as helping an older neighbor carry groceries, had a stronger positive effect on well-being than did more formal instances of prosocial behavior, such as volunteering for a charity at a pre-scheduled time.

Other research suggests that cultivating positive emotions, such as gratitude, may also facilitate prosocial behavior. A study by Bartlett & DeSteno examined the ability of gratitude to shape costly prosocial behavior, demonstrating that gratitude increases efforts to assist a benefactor even when such efforts are costly (i.e., hedonically negative), and that this increase is qualitatively different from efforts given from just general positive affective state. They also show that gratitude can increase assistance provided to strangers, not just close social ties. Awe is another positive emotional state that has been closely linked to inspiring generosity and prosocial behavior. Piff et al. studied this phenomenon through experiments using economic and ethical-decision making games and explain, "When people experience awe they really want to share that experience with other people, suggesting that it has this particularly viral component to it... awe binds people together—by causing people to want to share their positive experiences collectively with one another."

== Psychopathy and Prosocial Deficits ==
In 1941, Hervey Cleckley described psychopathy as a disorder in which individuals often initially appear intelligent, charming, and even kind but are in fact egocentric, grandiose and impulsive. He described individuals who would, on a whim, leave their families to cross the country gambling, drinking and fighting, only to return and act as if nothing was out of the ordinary.

Today, psychopathy is described as antisocial personality disorder, which is characterized by decreased anxiety, fear, and social closeness as well as increased impulsivity, manipulativeness, interpersonal dominance and aggression. These traits lead to numerous types of antisocial behavior including high rates of substance abuse, serial short term relationships, and various forms of criminal behavior. One common misconception about psychopathy though is that all psychopaths are serial killers or other vicious criminals. In reality, many researchers do not consider criminal behavior to be a criterion for the disorder although the role of criminality in the disorder is strongly debated. Additionally, psychopathy is being researched as a dimensional construct that is one extreme of normal range personality traits instead of a categorical disorder.

In regards to the lack of prosocial behavior in psychopathy, there are several theories that have been proposed in the literature. One theory suggests that psychopaths engage in less prosocial behavior (and conversely more antisocial behavior) because of a deficit in their ability to recognize fear in others, particularly fearful facial expressions. Because they are unable to recognize that their actions are causing another distress, they continue that behavior in order to obtain some goal that benefits them. A second theory proposes that psychopaths have a sense of "altruistic punishment" where they are willing to punish other individuals even if it means they will be harmed in some way. There has also been an evolutionary theory proposed stating that psychopaths lack of prosocial behavior is an adaptive mating strategy in that it allows them to spread more of their genes while taking less responsibility for their offspring. Finally, there is some evidence that in some situations psychopaths behavior may not be antisocial but instead it may be more utilitarian than other individuals. In a recent study, Bartels & Pizarro (2011) found that when making decisions about traditional moral dilemmas such as the trolley problem, individuals high in psychopathic traits actually make more utilitarian (and therefore more moral in some views) choices. This finding is particularly interesting because it suggests that psychopaths, who are often considered immoral or even evil, may actually make better moral decisions than non-psychopaths. The authors of this study conclude that individuals high in psychopathic traits are less influenced by their emotions and therefore make more "mathematical" decisions and choose the option that leads to the lowest number of deaths.

The theories discussed above are not intended to be a comprehensive list but instead to provide a sense of how psychopaths differ in their approach to social interactions. As with most psychological/social phenomena, it is likely a combination of these factors that leads to psychopaths' lack of prosocial behavior. Further research is needed to determine the causal nature of any one of these individual deficits as well as if there is any way to help these individuals develop more prosocial patterns of behavior.

== The Emotional Uplift of Giving ==
Psychologists have shown that helping others can produce "feel-good" neurotransmitters such as oxytocin and that, similar to any other pleasurable activity, the act of volunteering, giving and behaving pro-socially can become addictive (warm-glow giving).

Some work has been done on utilizing this principle through the concept of helper therapy, in which therapeutic benefits are gleaned from assisting others. Community health workers have been found to gain helper benefits that include positive feelings about self, a sense of belonging, valuable work experience, and access to health information and skills through their prosocial vocation, which may buffer against the various stressors inherent in this line of work.

In addition, Helper therapy may also be highly beneficial for distressed adolescents experiencing suicidal thoughts. Studies indicate that when help-seeking youth use online community forums, the help-seekers often begin to provide support for other help seekers, and develop a reciprocal prosocial community battling depression together.

== Altruistic dissidence ==
Stefano Passini and Davide Morselli argue that groups will obey authority so long as its system, basis, and demands are viewed as legitimate. Passini and Morselli distinguish between anti-social disobedience, which they see as destructive, and prosocial disobedience, which they see as constructive. "Disobedience becomes prosocial when it is enacted for the sake of the whole society, including all its different levels and groups. In contrast, anti-social disobedience is enacted mainly in favour of one's own group, in order to attain individual rights." A main difference between anti-social and pro-social dissidence is the way that they relate to authority; anti-social dissidents reject authority and disobey its norms and laws, while pro-social dissidents understand the important roles that societal laws play in maintaining order, but also recognize and address the flaws in authoritative reasoning. Pro-social protests, if viewed in a positive manner, can increase freedoms and equality for the general public, and improve democratic institutions.

== Labor market outcomes ==
Recent scientific research shows that individuals who volunteer have better labor market outcomes in terms of hiring opportunities and wages.

== See also ==
- Altruism – Concern for the well-being of others
- Cooperation – Groups working or acting together
- Eusociality – Highest level of animal sociality a species can attain
- Friendship – Mutual affection between people
- Helping behavior – Voluntarily prosocial behaviour
- Humanitarian aid – Material or logistical assistance for people in need
- Reciprocal altruism – Form of behaviour between organisms
- Rescue – Operations for life saving, removal from danger and liberation from restraint
- Sharing – Joint use of a resource or space
- Social animal – Form of collective animal behaviour
- Socialization – Lifelong process of inheriting and disseminating norms, customs and ideologies
- Social psychology – Study of social effects on people's thoughts, feelings, and behaviors
- Social support – Support systems for individuals
- Social value orientations
- Volunteering – Act of freely giving time and labor
- Tootling – Reporting of only positive, rather than inappropriate, social behaviors
