= Response-Ability =

- Company type: Non-profit organization
- Industry: Education
- Founded: 1974
- Headquarters: Rosemont, Pennsylvania, U.S.
- Key people: Elizabeth Eager, Executive Director Joanne Sullivan SHCJ, Spiritual Director
- Website: www.ravolunteers.org

Response-Ability is a non-profit volunteer service program that places college graduates in inner-city Catholic schools in the United States and in other international sites across the U.S. It is a member of the Catholic Network of Volunteer Services and is affiliated with AmeriCorps.

A ministry of the Society of the Holy Child Jesus (SHCJ) that is grounded in Cornelia Connelly's educational philosophy, Response-Ability trains volunteers to provide education and service in inner city schools and international sites.

== History ==
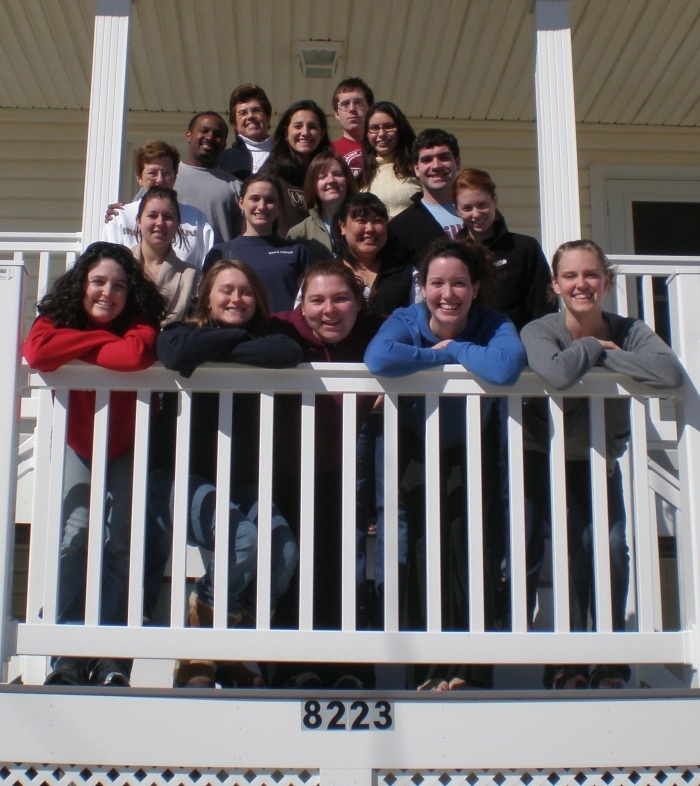
Volunteers and staff on retreat in 2009

The program began in 1974 as a vocations awareness program for the SHCJ. Sisters would bring college-age students to various sites throughout the U.S. to perform service for three weeks over the summer. Inspired by the work of Teach for America, Response-Ability launched its Teacher Service Program in Philadelphia in 1993. Volunteers began to serve as teachers in inner-city parochial school classrooms. This was beneficial to many schools that faced the possibility of closure.

In the following years, the program grew to include volunteer houses in Los Angeles and Washington, D.C. At the same time, the Holy Child Sisters requested that volunteers work with them in the Dominican Republic and in Chile. These volunteers, mainly women, work in the areas of education, health care, and social services.

There are currently ten Response-Ability volunteers serving in Washington, D.C., Philadelphia, and Los Alcarrizos in the Dominican Republic. Volunteers serve in pre-school through High School settings in positions that range from classroom teachers to music teachers and Montessori assistants. As many volunteers do not have formal backgrounds in education training, they partake in ample professional development throughout the year, including a two-week intensive orientation training program and graduate courses in education.

Additionally, volunteers go on biannual retreats to reflect and focus on their personal spiritual growth.
