= Circle of Courage =

Youth development model

The Circle of Courage is a model of youth development based on the principles of belonging, mastery, independence, and generosity. The model integrates child development practices of tribal peoples and the findings of modern youth development research.

== History ==
The Circle of Courage model portrays four growth needs of all children: Belonging, Mastery, Independence, and Generosity. This philosophy emerged from collaboration of Martin Brokenleg, a professor of Native American Studies, and Larry Brendtro, a professor in children's behavior disorders. They studied how traditional indigenous cultures reared children without resorting to coercive discipline. The Circle of Courage is illustrated as a medicine wheel with four directions.

In 1990, the Circle of Courage was outlined in the Solution Tree publication, Reclaiming Youth at Risk, by Larry Brendtro, Martin Brokenleg, and Steve Van Bockern who were then colleagues at Augustana College.

The model was adopted to youth services in South Africa during the administration of Nelson Mandela under the leadership of Minister Geraldine Moloketi and Lesley du Toit. This led in 2005 to the Response Ability Pathways (RAP) curriculum which provides training on applying the Circle of Courage to all who work with youth.

The Circle of Courage provides the philosophical foundation for the work of Reclaiming Youth International (RYI), a 501(c)(3) non-profit company dedicated to helping adults better serve children and youth who are in emotional pain from conflict in the family, school, community, peer groups or with self.

== Annotated bibliography: Related publications ==
- "A Comprehensive Evaluation of Life Space Crisis Intervention (LSCI)" by Larry F. Forthun, Jeffery W. McCombie, & Caroline Payne in G.S. Goodman (ED)., Educational Psychology Reader (Peter Lang, 2010) pp. 560–580. This chapter reviews this 'competency based professional development training for teachers." This study validates the positive effects of LSCI on both students and their educational environment.
- Reclaiming Youth at Risk by Larry Brendtro, Martin Brokenleg, & Steve Van Bockern. An overview of the Circle of Courage model which applies Native American principles of child rearing to education, treatment, and youth development.
- Reclaiming Children and Youth journal, edited by Larry Brendtro, Nicholas Long, & Martin Mitchell (published quarterly from 1994 to 2014). Includes topical issues on a full range of strength-based interventions for children experiencing emotional and behavioral problems. Published by Circle of Courage Institute at Starr Commonwealth, Sioux Falls, SD.
- Positive Peer Culture: A Selected Bibliography edited by George Giacobbe, Elaine Traynelis-Yurek, Larry Powell, & Erik Laursen. Summarizes research on peer helping grounded in Circle of Courage principles of attachment, achievement, autonomy, and altruism.
- The EQUIP Program by John Gibbs, Granville Potter, & Arnold Goldstein. Integrates Positive Peer Culture with research on Aggression Replacement Training.
- Strength-Based Strategies for Children and Youth: An Annotated Bibliography edited by George Giacobbe, Elaine Traynelis-Yurek, & Erik Laursen. Reviews research on Positive Peer Culture, teamwork approaches, and cognitive restructuring.
- Reclaiming Our Prodigal Sons and Daughters by Scott Larson & Larry Brendtro. Applies Circle of Courage principles to faith-based organizations and those concerned with spiritual development of youth.
- Restructuring for Caring and Effective Education by Richard Villa & Jacqueline Thousand. A text on the paradigm shift and strategies for creating inclusive schools and classrooms.
- Schools with Spirit: Nurturing the Inner Lives of Children and Teachers edited by Linda Lantieri. Discusses Circle of Courage values as central to social and emotional learning in this exposition on transforming schools.
- Mentoring for Talent Development edited by Ken McCluskey & Annabelle Mays. Integrates concepts from gifted education, creativity, and mentoring marginalized young people.
- Troubled Children and Youth: Turning Problems into Opportunities by Larry Brendtro and Mary Shahbazian. Presents research based strategies for using crisis as opportunity and cultivating strengths in young people.
- Kids Who Outwit Adults by John Seita & Larry Brendtro. Discloses the logic behind troubled and defiant acts and strategies to reach adult-wary youth.
- No Disposable Kids by Larry Brendtro, Arlin Ness, & Martin Mitchell. Challenges the notion that any child is unable to be helped and shares strategies based on research and cases.
- Response Ability Pathways: Restoring Bonds of Respect by Larry Brendtro & Lesley du Toit with foreword by Martin Brokenleg. This text accompanies RAP training which provides practical training on connecting with youth in conflict, clarifying problems and challenges, and restoring harmony.
- Kinder stärken Kinder (Children helping children) by Gunther Opp and Nicola Unger. Applies strength-based principles for building positive peer cultures to emotionally troubled students.
- The Resilience Revolution by Larry Brendtro & Scott Larson. Practical strategies to help children overcome pain in their lives and develop resilience.
- Conflict in the Classroom: Positive Staff Support for Troubled Students by Nicholas Long, William Morse, Frank Fescer, and Ruth Newman. A compendium of articles on aspects of building safe and reclaiming schools.
- Connecting with Kids in Conflict: A Life Space Legacy by William C. Morse. Historical perspectives and principles in the education and treatment of troubled children, by William C. Morse (1915-2008) of the University of Michigan.
- Deep Brain Learning: Pathways to Potential with Challenging Youth by Larry Brendtro, Martin Mitchell, and Herm McCall. Identifies evidence-based principles for effective interventions with challenging children and youth through a consilience of neuroscience, psychology, practice wisdom, and expertise of children and families.
- Kündenorientierung-Partizipation-Respekt (Client focused-participation-respect) edited by Karen Sanders and Michael Bock. Highlights new directions in youth work including Positive Peer Culture and RAP models.
- Classroom Management: Engaging Students in Learning by Tim McDonald. Develops a "Positive Learning Framework" based on Circle of Courage principles with strategies for developing environments where students can succeed.
- TherapyWise: Creating Courage from Within by Robert Foltz (in press). A guide for teens in therapy (and their parents) for benefiting from treatment with psychologists, psychiatrists, social workers, counselors.
