= Bilingual education by country or region =

In bilingual education, students are taught content areas like math, science, and history in two (or more) languages. Numerous countries or regions have implemented different forms of bilingual education.

== Africa ==
A 1990 study of linguistics within African countries noted that 22 out of 34 countries used African indigenous languages as an official media of instruction in primary schools. However, out of those 22 countries, only 3 extended this usage to secondary schooling. In general, schooling in an indigenous language is limited to around the first 3–4 years of school, with countries like Ghana, Kenya, and Malawi enforcing a 3 year period, and countries like Uganda, Namibia, and parts of Nigeria enforcing 4 years.

Presently, countries such as Mozambique have taken the lead in bilingual education. The Ministry of Education and Human Development has made primary education fully bilingual in 2017. Children will be taught 16 Mozambican dialects during their early years of schooling. Many African states introduce mother languages as subjects, and education tools along commonly spoken international or foreign languages. Mother language instruction is terminated immediately during the schooling cycle, and leaves only the international language established. It becomes a disadvantage that contributes to substantial lack of motivation on the part of teachers, students, and parents.

=== Senegal ===
Although bilingual schools exist, the majority of Senegalese schools teach in French and follow the French system. However, studies have shown that approximately 80% of teachers use a 'local language' to communicate with all of their students.

== Asia ==
=== China ===
In the autonomous regions of China many children of the country's major ethnic minorities attend public schools where the medium of instructions is the local language, such as Uyghur or Tibetan. Traditionally, the textbooks there were little different from merely a translated version of the books used in the Chinese schools throughout the country; however, as of 2001, a move was on foot to create more teaching materials with locally based content.

Classes of Mandarin as second language are also offered in these minority schools, and the central government makes increasing efforts to make them more effective. A law passed in February 2001 provided for the Mandarin-as-second-language classes in the ethnic-minority schools to start in the early years of elementary school whenever local conditions permit, rather than in the senior years of elementary school, as it was practiced before.

On the other hand, it has been reported that Chinese has been used as the medium of instructions in some autonomous counties even though less than 50% of the population "spoke and understood some Chinese"; this mismatch was thought to have contributed to the low grades earned by the students on the math and Chinese exams.

==== Hong Kong ====
In Hong Kong where both English and Cantonese are official, both languages are taught in school and are mandatory subjects. Either English or Cantonese is used as the medium of instruction for other subjects. Increasingly, there are a large number of Mandarin Chinese-speaking schools in operation throughout Hong Kong as well since 1996. Study of Mandarin is mandatory in junior years (from Grade 1 to Grade 9). Hong Kong also has a bilingual education program using both Cantonese and Hong Kong Sign Language.

==== Macau ====
Chinese and Portuguese are the official languages of Macau, but English plays an unofficial and highly prominent role. English is the language of instruction at the University of Macau and at some secondary schools. Other schools use Cantonese as the language of instruction. As of 2013 there was one private Portuguese-medium school. Starting in the 2017–2018 school year, the government started offering bilingual Chinese–Portuguese classes in two public schools: Escola Oficial Zheng Guanying and Escola Primária Luso-Chinesa da Flora.

==== Tibet ====
Education in the Tibet Autonomous Region is provided in Tibetan and in Standard Mandarin Chinese. The Chinese government intended to maintain language diversity while increasing the Mandarin language skills of Tibetan students. However, it is alleged that the education system downplays the importance of Tibetan, and that mathematics, science and social studies classes are only taught in Mandarin. It has been alleged that a reduction of the use of Tibetan in bilingual education is a human rights issue.

=== Iran ===
Until 2022, Iran had a couple languages; in July 2023, six new languages have been added: Chinese, Russian, French, Arabic, Spanish, German, and Italian.

=== Japan ===
In Japan, the need for bilingualism (mostly Japanese and English) has been pointed out, and there are some scholars who advocate teaching children subjects such as mathematics using English rather than Japanese. As part of this proposal, subjects such as history, however, would be taught solely in Japanese.

On the island of Hokkaido, the indigenous and endangered Ainu language is receiving newfound interest with establishment of a small number of bilingual Ainu–Japanese elementary schools.

The largest non-Japanese, non-native to Japan minority are the Koreans. Bilingual education in Korean language is provided by Korean international schools, more of which are affiliated with Chongryon.

Japan has adopted English as the second language, partly because English is one of the most significant global lingua franca owing to globalization. Nyree states that Japan performs poorly in English, evidenced by its ranking as number 29 out of 30 Asian countries that took part in an English test despite choosing it over languages close to it, such as Chinese and Korean. Due to fewer hours dedicated to learning English, the Japanese have challenges communicating in English.

Few students are attracted to English medium instruction (EMI) programs in undergraduate courses despite the increase in EMI programs. According to Jones, English was compulsory for sixth- and fifth-grade students, who were taught English weekly through games and songs. In junior high school, an English lesson takes thirty-five minutes a week. English takes approximately 612.5 hours in high school.A total of 97% of junior high school administer an entrance English exam to high school, which encourages the students to take English studies seriously.

In 2017, 80,119 non-Japanese children in Japan did not speak Japanese as their first language. Of these, 29,363 took foreign languages other than English, including Spanish, Portuguese, and Filipino. Less than 20% of all the non-Japanese-speaking children in Japan are involved in bilingual programs, and more than 63% of them are engaged in studying Japanese programs to enable them to communicate in Japan since most of them are immigrants. According to Statista, the number of monolingual kids learning a foreign language was 12.9%.

Most individuals learn a second language after attaining the age of six. Therefore, Japan has late bilingualism. Japanese students start learning English as a second language in junior high school. In elementary school, the Japanese do not put a lot of emphasis on the language. The Japanese bilingual education is different from other countries, such as Australia where children begin learning a second language when they are three years through their primary caregivers and preschool programs. Hence, the type of bilingualism in Australia is the success of early bilingualism.

=== Middle East ===
==== Arab World ====
Schools in the Middle East follow dual or triple language programmes. The triple language programme is most commonly found in Lebanon, Tunisia, Syria, and often implemented as well in Egypt. History, grammar, literature and the Arabic language are taught in the native language (Arabic), whereas mathematics and sciences are generally taught in English or French. In Lebanon, however, science and mathematics are taught in either French or English, depending on the school's administration or the grade level. It is not uncommon to find French- or English- only schools, though usually these institutions are primarily international establishments.

In most Gulf countries as well as Jordan, English is introduced as a second language early on alongside the primary medium of instruction, Arabic. In Iraq however, triple language programmes are, like in Lebanon and Syria, normal, except rather than using French, Kurdish is taught alongside Arabic and English due to Iraq's considerably sized Kurdish minority in the north, and bilingual official language policy regarding Kurdish.

In Morocco, Berber can be used as a regional medium of elementary education, with widespread use of French and Arabic in higher grades. Due to Morocco's history of French colonialism, sole French-medium education is very widespread. In certain areas, Spanish is taught instead of French because of former Spanish colonization of small parts of the country.

==== Israel ====
Normally, Israelis are taught in either Hebrew or Arabic depending on religion and ethnicity. Within the standard education system, thorough study of English is compulsory, and depending on the primary medium of education, Arabic or Hebrew are introduced as third languages with significantly lesser emphasis placed on achieving solid proficiency. Within Hebrew-medium programmes, other foreign languages such as French, German, Russian, or Yiddish can often be studied as well.

Israel is also home to several international schools whereby the sole medium of education is either English or French. In general, as English is taught early on across all Israeli schools, most Israelis become comfortably bilingual, much like what one would see in The Netherlands or Scandinavian countries. This in combination with a large proportion of English-language programming on television that is merely subtitled and seldom dubbed.

Recent peace initiatives have also led to a small number of bilingual and multi-religious schools in which both Hebrew and Arabic are used in equal emphasis. The Hand in Hand: Center for Jewish Arab Education in Israel runs four bilingual schools, and the Neve Shalom peace village also hosts a local school.

=== Mongolia ===
There has been long-standing encouragement to teach at least one other language other than Mongolian. Traditionally, Russian was taught during middle school and high school. After the 1990 transition to democracy, English has been gaining more ground in Mongolian schools. Today many public schools at all levels teach one other language that are usually English, Russian, Korean, Japanese or Chinese. Although the core curriculum is in Mongolian, it is generally encouraged by the government and the public that the students should have some command of a secondary language when they graduate from high school. Also there are other private schools that teach their curricula in English.

=== South Asia ===
South Asia is the southern region of the Asian continent, comprising the sub-Himalayan South Asian Association for Regional Cooperation (SAARC) countries and, for some authorities, adjoining countries to the west and east.

==== Bangladesh ====
In Bangladesh, Bengali (or Bangla) is the first language and means of instructions is Bangla in all public schools. However, it has a colonial past and English is widely used in administrations, schools, and courts, among others. Bangladeshi children start English as second language quite early in their age (mostly from age 5 to 6). In the national curriculum, English is given an importance and it is taught compulsorily until the twelfth grade. There are government-approved curricula as well as other international systems of education which maintain English as a medium of instruction.

==== India ====
The official languages of the Union of India are Hindi and English, with 21 other regional languages holding co-official status, including Assamese, Bengali, Bodo, Dogri, Gujarati, Kannada, Kashmiri, Konkani, Maithili, Malayalam, Manipuri, Marathi, Nepali, Odia, Punjabi, Sanskrit, Santali, Sindhi, Tamil, Telugu and Urdu.

Education in India follows the three-language formula, in which children are taught English (or the medium of instruction in the school, grades 1–12) as the first language. The second language (grades 1–10) is the official language of the state (In most non-Hindi states) or Hindi (in the others); in a few states, some schools offer a choice between the state language and Hindi. The third language (grades 5–8, often Hindi in the non-Hindi states) is the regional language of the state (if the student opted for Hindi as the second language, a foreign language or Sanskrit). An exception is Tamil Nadu, where only Tamil and English are taught.

English-medium schools often find favour with parents, especially in urban areas, due to English's international prestige, India's colonial heritage, its usage in Indian business and it being the medium of instruction in most Indian universities.

==== Pakistan ====
In Pakistan, English is an official language along with Urdu and is a compulsory subject taught from primary school level to higher level studies. A student is expected in Pakistan to work in multiple languages such as Urdu, English and an indigenous language as majority of the country is bilingual and the more literate people are mostly trilingual.

=== Southeast Asia ===
Southeast is a subregion of Asia, consisting of the countries that are geographically south of China, east of India, west of New Guinea and north of Australia.

==== Philippines ====
In July 2009 Department of Education moved towards mother-tongue based learning initially by issuing an order which allowed two alternative three-year bridging plans. Depending on the bridging plan adopted, the Filipino and English languages are to be phased in as the language of instruction beginning in the third and fourth grades. Other Philippine regional languages are taught in schools, colleges and universities located in their respective provinces.

==== Singapore ====
In Singapore, education is monolingual. The medium of instruction is in English and the learning of the mother tongue is compulsory. The mother tongue subject is usually Mandarin, Malay or Tamil, the other official languages of Singapore. They are taught till pre-university level. Previously, students either attended an English-medium or a "vernacular school", which taught in one of the mother tongues. In 1960, government legislation standardised the primary medium of instruction to English, with the different vernacular languages ("mother tongue") allocated as the second language.

Students may also choose to learn a third language (German, French, Japanese, etc.) in secondary school and junior college or, if their respective school does not offer the language, at a MOE Language Centre. This option is limited however, to the top 10% of any PSLE cohort; prospective third language students must have also scored A grades for English and their second language. Singaporean students returning from abroad who did not learn a second language may be exempted from their mother tongue and learn another second language in place of the mother tongue; however, such exemptions are rare and only granted on a case-to-case basis.

==== Thailand and Malaysia ====
Since the mid-1990s bilingual approaches to schooling and higher education have become popular in parts of South-east Asia, especially in Thailand and Malaysia where different models have been applied, from L2 immersion (content taught in a non-native language) to parallel immersion, where core subjects are taught in both the mother-tongue and a second language (usually English).

English has been taught in schools in Malaysia as it is a Commonwealth country (former British colony). During the 1980s to 1990s, when schools were nationalised under the government of Prime Minister Mahathir Mohamad, English became a second language instead of the primary language of instruction. The Malaysian government reversed its decision to have Maths and Science taught in English, but is implementing different programmes designed to improve English language teaching within schools. The decision has raised numerous debates, with various groups arguing for and against the use of English in schools. With the existence of vernacular schools and prominent usage of dialects, some Chinese and Indian children become trilingual, speaking Malay, English and their mother tongue or dialect. However, English is still widely spoken as a de facto language of trade and academia.

The English for Integrated Studies (EIS) project model initiated in 2003 at Sunthonphu Pittaya Secondary School (SPSS), Rayong, Thailand, is an exemplar of the use of English for integrated studies in Math, Science and IT, taught by non-native English speaking Thai teachers. In the year 2015 expanded to 500 schools all region of Thailand. This project is under the auspices of the International Study Program of Burapha University. Wichai Wittaya Bilingual School in Chiang Mai (1995), Siriwat Wittaya Bilingual School in Bangkok (2004), Chindemanee School English Program (2005), The Sarasas model, pioneered by the Sarasas schools affiliation in Thailand, are exemplars of parallel immersion. Panyaden School is an example of a private bilingual school in North Thailand that provides its students with a Thai-English education (each class has a Thai teacher and native-English speaking teacher).

The difficulties and disputes characteristic of the US experience have not been replicated in these Asian countries, though they are not without controversy. Generally, it can be said that there is widespread acknowledgment of the need to improve English competence in the population, and bilingual approaches, where language is taught through subject content, are seen to be the most effective means of attaining this. The most significant limiting factors are the shortage of teachers linguistically competent to teach in a second language and the costs involved in use of expatriate native speakers for this purpose.

== Australia ==
Bilingual education in Australia may be divided into three different types, or target audiences, each having somewhat different purposes: Aboriginal and Torres Strait Islander peoples; immigrant groups; and English speakers looking to add another language to their education. The first two are interested in language maintenance and language revitalisation for ensuing generations. Some schools teach bilingual programs that cater to children speaking languages other than English. Bilingual education for Indigenous (Aboriginal and Torres Strait Islander) students, however, has only received intermittent official backing.

== Europe ==
The European Schools group is a network of thirteen private schools in EU countries that provide multilingual and multicultural education at nursery, primary and secondary levels.

=== Albania ===
Foreign language education is a mandatory component of the national curriculum. Pupils begin learning their first foreign language in the third grade, and an optional second foreign language is introduced in the fifth or sixth grade. At the secondary level, passing a foreign language is one of the mandatory national exams for graduation and university admission as part of the State Matura (Matura Shtetërore). High school students can choose to be tested in English, French, Italian, or German. At the tertiary level, Albanian universities offer study programs in a wide range of languages, including English, French, German, Italian, Greek, Turkish, Russian, and Spanish. For the 2018-2019 academic year, over 1,000 new students enrolled in bachelor's programs at the Faculty of Foreign Languages at the University of Tirana alone.

=== Belgium ===
Belgium has three official languages: Dutch, French and German. The constitution guarantees free education, so private schools can use any language, but state(-recognised) schools teach in the language of the language area where it is located. For Brussels, which is an officially bilingual French–Dutch area, schools use either Dutch or French as medium.

Even though Belgium has two major languages (Dutch in Flanders, and French in Wallonia), bilingual instruction does rarely occur since Belgian law only permits education in one official language. In Flanders, bilingual instruction is only allowed as a short-term project.

=== France ===
France has one official language, French. However, regional provincial languages including Corsican, Breton, Gallo, Basque, Franco-Provençal, Occitan, and Catalan have charter protection, and bilingual education programmes and regional language course electives have been established. However, due to the strict French-language policy imposed by national government, there is no centrally allocated funding for any of these programmes. All funding is at the municipal level, with many of the regional languages face extreme endangerment. France is known for wanting to maintain its lingual and cultural roots, and speaking a language other than French or mixing French with other languages is looked down on. This is apparent the French educational system, where French is highly prioritized over other languages and emphasis is put not only on the maintenance of the French language, but also on pushing students not to integrate French with other languages.

=== Republic of Ireland ===
The Republic of Ireland has two official languages: Irish and English. With the Irish language facing endangerment, as well as the presence of regions where Irish is still spoken as native (referred to as the Gaeltacht), the Irish constitution protects and reserves the right for education to be established through the medium of either official language, and it thus is.

An Irish-medium school is referred to as Gaelscoil (plural, Gaelscoileanna) This movement has been met with some success in that 10% of the schooling in Ireland is conducted in Irish. The movement has also been successful in setting up schools in both urban and rural areas, ranging from Dublin and Cork, to the traditional Gaeltacht regions.

=== Latvia ===
According to the State Language Law, the official state language of Latvia is Latvian; however, national minority education programmes are provided in seven languages: Russian, Polish, Hebrew, Ukrainian, Estonian, Lithuanian, and Belarusian.

In 2018 there were a total of 104 educational institutions implementing minority education programs. A total of 94 schools were implementing education programs in Russian and bilingually, 4 – in Polish and bilingually, 1 – in Ukrainian and bilingually, 2 – in Hebrew, 1 – in Latvian and Lithuanian, and 1 – in Latvian and Estonian, but 68 schools had both Latvian and minority language programmes.

=== Netherlands ===
In the Netherlands, there are around 100 bilingual schools. In these schools, the first language is Dutch, whereas the second language is usually English and occasionally German. In the province of Friesland, where West Frisian is an official language, some primary schools are trilingual, teaching in Dutch, West Frisian, and English. Most bilingual secondary schools are TVWO (Bilingual Preparatory Scientific Education), but THAVO (Bilingual Higher General Secondary Education) and TVMBO-TL (Bilingual Preparatory Vocational Education – Theoretical Learning Pathway) have been introduced, too.

=== Spain ===
Spain adopted bilingual education in 1996 with the agreement between the National Spanish Ministry of Education and British Council. They decided to attempt this with an immersion program. This agreement was done to encourage cultural diversity through learning two languages. Spain promoted additive bilingual education in English, and many natives from The United States, Great Britain, and Ireland worked as assistants in the bilingual classrooms.

==== Andalusia ====
In Andalusia (Spain's southernmost region), things have changed drastically concerning bilingual education since the introduction of the Plurilingualism Promotion Plan by the autonomous government. The plan was born as the realization for the Andalusian territory of the European language policies regarding the teaching and learning of languages. With special strength in the past ten years bilingual education has worked at most elementary schools.

In addition to the new European scheme, the Scheme for the Promotion of Plurilingualism learned from the first experimental bilingual sections set up in some schools by the Andalusian government in 1998. Following the content-based approach, French and German were partially used to teach other subjects. The international tests that the students have been given show that the program was successful. The scheme is the starting point for a more ambitious scene, where 400 schools will be involved in the next four years, more languages, especially English, will take part, and a lot of investigation and implementation of the Integrated Curriculum of languages must be carried out.

Being aware of the necessity of the Andalusian people to adapt to the new scenario, a major government plan, called "strategies for the second modernization of Andalusia", was designed in 2003. The document also underlined language diversity as a source of richness and a valuable heritage of humankind that needs to be looked after.

It was then clear that a scheme was needed to carry out this new language policy in the territory, especially affecting education, with clear goals, timing and funding.

The scheme is to be developed through five major programmes and also an organization and assessment plan.

The programmes are:

- Bilingual schools
- Official Schools of Languages
- Plurilingualism and teachers
- Plurilingualism and society
- Organization and assessment plan.

==== Basque Country, Navarre, Galicia, Catalonia, Valencia and the Balearic Islands ====
In addition to Castilian Spanish being the primary official language of Spain, the kingdom also has several co-official regional languages which enjoy equal and unbiased constitutional protection and promotion: Catalan/Valencian (in Catalonia, Valencia and the Balearic Islands), Galician (in Galicia), Basque (in the Basque Country and the northern zone of Navarre) and Aranese (in Val d'Aran, Catalonia).

Many schools are bilingual in the regional language as well as Castilian at both the elementary and secondary levels. Regional universities also often provide programmes through the regional medium. Education in all co-official languages uses to receive both national and regional funding.

Unlike France in which regional languages face incredible endangerment and possible extinction, Spain's long-established approach to making regional bilingual education mandatory has served often as a model for both the survival and thriving state of the languages indigenous to the country.

=== Sweden ===
Sweden has one official language and five recognized minority languages, though Swedish is to great extent the only one of these in which education is offered. During the 21st century more and more schools started to offer national programs in English.

=== United Kingdom and dependencies ===
The British Isles have several indigenous languages apart from English. These include Welsh (official in Wales), Irish, Manx Gaelic, Cornish, Scottish Gaelic, and the Scots language (which is sometimes considered as a dialect of English).

Scotland, Northern Ireland, Wales, Cornwall, and the Isle of Man have each established bilingual programmes which provide education through the medium of their indigenous language. Most often, except for the cases of Manx and Cornish, these programmes exist where the language is spoken communally as a first language.

==== Wales ====
Roughly a quarter of schoolchildren in Wales now receive their education through the medium of Welsh, and children wishing to join a Welsh medium school (Welsh: ysgol Gymraeg) do not have to speak Welsh to go to one if they are young enough to learn the language quickly. Welsh medium education has met with great success across Wales since the first such schools opened in the 1940s. There are current plans to extend further provision in urban centres such as Cardiff, Newport, Swansea and Llanelli to cater for growing demand; this has caused controversy in some areas.

Welsh-speaking areas use Welsh-medium education almost exclusively. Parents have a legal right for their children to receive education in Welsh, and each local authority caters for this. In the Western flank of Wales, Carmarthenshire, Ceredigion, Gwynedd and Anglesey, most primary and secondary schools are Welsh medium or have bilingual streams. Some 75–80% of all pupils in Carmarthenshire and Ceredigion receive their education through the medium of Welsh, with this figure increasing in Gwynedd to around 90%.

In English-medium schools, the study of Welsh is compulsory and must be taught from age 5 to age 16 in all state-funded schools.

==== Northern Ireland ====
Irish Gaelic received official recognition in Northern Ireland for the first time in 1998 under the Good Friday Agreement. A cross-border body known as Foras na Gaeilge was established to promote the language in both Northern Ireland and the Republic.

The British government in 2001 ratified the European Charter for Regional or Minority Languages. Irish Gaelic (in respect only of Northern Ireland) was specified under Part III of the Charter, thus giving it a degree of protection and status somewhat comparable to the Welsh language in Wales and Scottish Gaelic in Scotland. This included a range of specific undertakings in relation to education, translation of statutes, interaction with public authorities, the use of placenames, media access, support for cultural activities and other matters (whilst the Ulster variant of Scots, known as Ulster Scots, was specified under Part II of the Charter.)

The Education (Northern Ireland) Order 1998 states: "It shall be the duty of the Department (of Education) to encourage and facilitate the development of Irish-medium education."

There are no Ulster Scots-medium schools, even at primary level.

== North America ==
=== Canada ===
==== English and French ====
In Canada, education is under provincial jurisdiction. However, the federal government has been a strong supporter of establishing Canada as a bilingual country and has helped pioneer the French immersion programs in the public education systems throughout Canada. In French-immersion, students with no previous French language training, usually beginning in Kindergarten or grade 1, do all of their school work in French. Depending on provincial jurisdiction, some provinces also offer an extended French program that begins in grade 5 which offers relatively more courses in French. In this case the student takes French immersion until grade nine but may continue throughout their high school education. Similar English-immersion programmes also exist for Francophone children.

Education is generally monolingual in either English or French according to the majority population within which a school is located. The second official language is introduced with allocated time provided each week for instruction in the language as a subject.

==== Quebec ====
Quebec is Canada's only legally monolingual French-speaking province. Based on section 59 of Canada's Constitution Act of 1982, provides that not all of the language rights listed under Canada's official bilingualism policy in previous section 23 will apply in Quebec. Specifically:

(1) In Quebec, a child may be educated in English only if at least one parent or a sibling was educated in Canada in English.

(2)In New Brunswick, Canada's only officially bilingual province, students have the right to education in the official language which they understand; students able to understand both languages have the right to education in either system.

(3) In the rest of Canada, a child may be educated in French if at least one parent or a sibling was educated in Canada in French, or if at least one parent has French as his or her mother tongue (defined in section 23 as "first language learned and still understood").

One practical consequence of this asymmetry is that all migrants who arrive in Quebec from foreign countries are required to place their children in French-language schools. This includes immigrants whose mother tongue is English and immigrants who received their schooling in English.

On the other hand, Section 23 provides a nearly universal right to English-language schooling for the children of Canadian-born anglophones living in Quebec.

Section 23 also provides, in theory, a nearly universal right to French-language schooling for the children of all francophones living outside Quebec, including immigrants from French-speaking countries who settle outside Quebec, and who are Canadian citizens.

Another element of asymmetry between Quebec and most anglophone provinces is that while Quebec provides public English-language primary and secondary education throughout the province, most other provinces provide French-language education only "where numbers warrant."

==== First Nations reserves and Inuit settlements ====
Canada also has bilingual programmes for First Nations' languages on numerous Canadian aboriginal reserves in combination with either English, French, or both. Some programmes are gradually being established, whilst others are already long established. Most notable bilingual programmes that exist include Inuktitut, Inuinnaqtun, Cree, Blackfoot, Ojibwe, Mohawk, Mi'kmaq, and Pacific Coast Salish languages.

Many of these programmes were set up in the late 1980s and early 1990s by academic linguists wishing to preserve the languages, respectively – especially in areas where there either is a healthy speaking base, or an endangerment of as low as two remaining speakers of a language. Prior to this, as late as the 1970s and early 1980s, First Nations and Inuit in Canada, as Native Americans in the United States, were forced into residential schools imposed on them by the Canadian government to integrate indigenous cultures into European-Canadian society. This came with the dramatic loss of the languages, religious beliefs, and cultures themselves due to widespread use of corporal punishment and mental abuse. As of 2010, new programmes are mushrooming across Canada to try to save what is left, but are often met with mixed success and funding challenges at federal, provincial, and reserve levels.

==== Other minority languages ====
In the province of British Columbia, the city of Vancouver since 2002 has established a new bilingual Mandarin Chinese-English immersion programme at the elementary school level to accommodate Vancouver's both historic and present strong ties to the Chinese-speaking world, already in itself having a very sizeable Chinese population local to the city. Six Vancouver schools have thus far adopted the programme, and a secondary school track to continue thereupon is being designed. Other suburbs within what is referred to as the Greater Vancouver Regional District are also considering adopting the programme into a small number of schools. Similar programmes are being developed for both Hindi and Punjabi to serve in representing the large South Asian cultural community and its interests in the City of Surrey. By default, most schools in British Columbia teach through English, with French immersion options available. In both English and French-medium schools, one can study and take government exams in Japanese, Punjabi, Mandarin Chinese, French, Spanish, and German at the secondary level.

In Alberta, the city of Edmonton has had a well established Chinese (Mandarin) bilingual education program (Edmonton Chinese Bilingual Education Association) since 1982. The program is currently offered in 13 schools throughout the city consisting of 6 elementary schools, 4 junior high schools and 3 high schools. Students enrolled in any of the elementary schools spend half a day learning in Chinese and the other half in English.

In Manitoba, Ukrainian communities have played an extensive role in the development and history of the province. Bilingual Ukrainian-English education programmes have therefore long been established, alongside smaller programmes introducing and implementing French, Icelandic in the town of Gimli, and First Nations' languages.

Private Islamic and Jewish schools across Canada also have bilingual and trilingual programmes that include Arabic or Hebrew, respectively.

In Cape Breton and other parts of Nova Scotia, a number of secondary schools now offer the option of taking introductory courses in Scottish Gaelic, as reflecting upon the province's both intimate and dark history with the Gaelic language and Highland Scottish diaspora.

=== United States ===
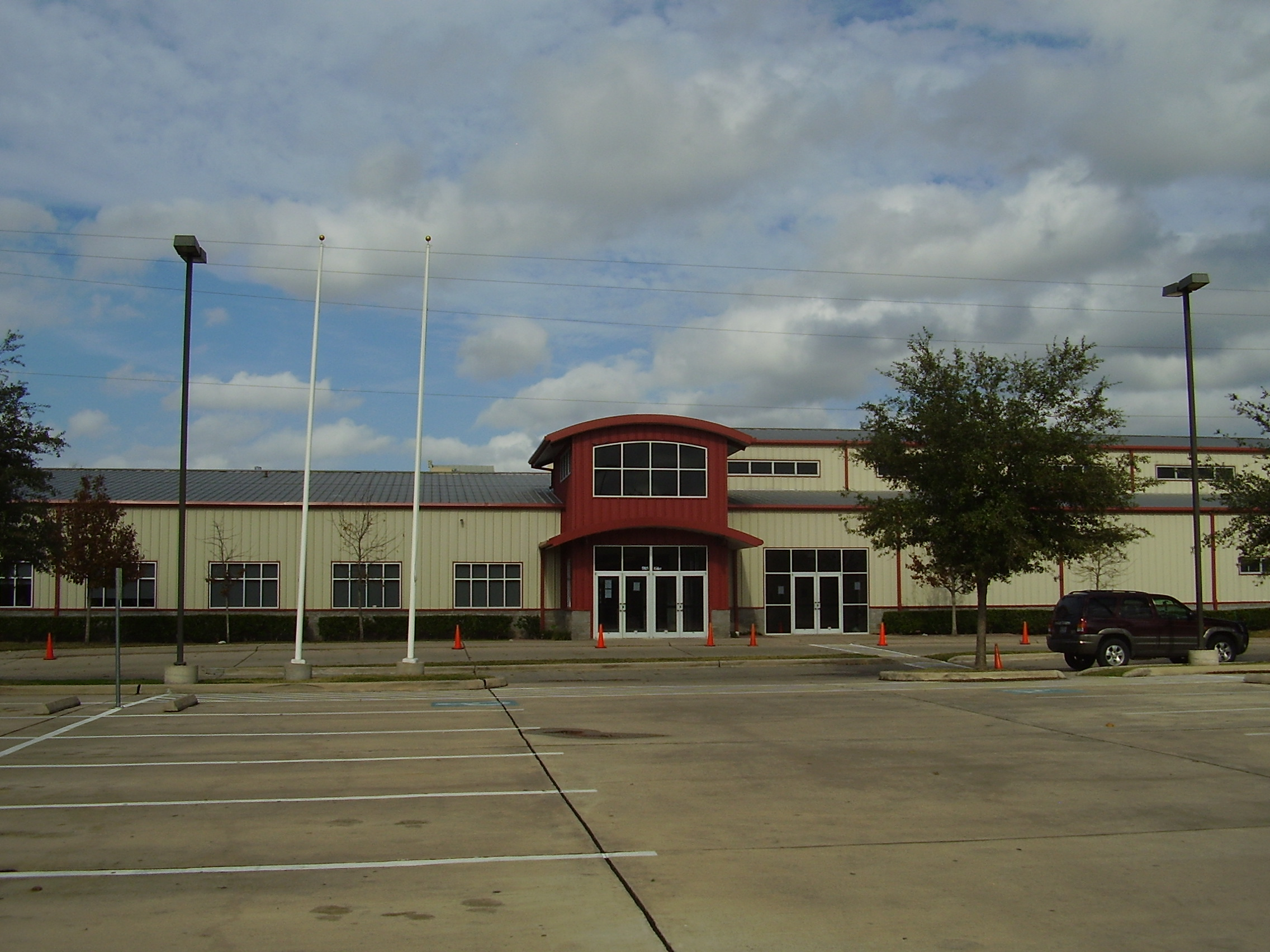
SER-Niños Charter School, a bilingual state charter school in the Gulfton area of Houston, Texas

Bilingual education in the U.S. focuses on English Language Learners (ELL).

The emphasis on English rejects that the student has a dominant language as part of their identity and culture that will continue to develop with time. According to the U.S. Department of Education website, a bilingual education program is "an educational program for limited English proficient students". (The Office of English Language Acquisition, 2009). The term "limited English proficiency" remains in use by the federal government, but has fallen out of favor elsewhere. According to Bankstreet's Literacy Guide this shift is due to the fact that the term ELL represents a more accurate reflection of language acquisition. The term "English language learner" is now preferred in schools and educational research to refer to a student whose first language is not English and who needs language support services to succeed in school.

In the United States, proponents of the practice argue that it will not only help to keep non-English-speaking children from falling behind their peers in math, science, and social studies while they master English, but such programs teach English better than English-only programs. For many students, the process of learning literacy and a new language simultaneously is simply an overwhelming task, so bilingual programs began as a way to help such students develop native language literacy first – research by Cummins, a central researcher in the field, shows that skills such as literacy developed in a first language will transfer to English. Opponents of bilingual education argue that it delays students' mastery of English, thereby retarding the learning of other subjects as well. In California, where at least one-third of students were enrolled in bilingual classes in the mid-1990s, there has been considerable politicking for and against bilingual education.

The very first instance of bilingual education in the United States occurred with Polish immigrants in the first permanent English settlement of Virginia in what is now the United States. The Poles provided the community with manufactured pitch necessary to prevent the sinking of ships, and glass works among other industries. When the House of Burgesses met in 1619, the rights extended only to Englishmen. The Poles, in turn, launched the first recorded strike in the New World. In dire need of their skills and industries, the Poles received the "rights of Englishmen," and established the first bilingual schools with subjects taught in English and Polish. From this first documented historic beginning, bilingual education existed in some form or another in the United States. During the 18th century, Franciscan missionaries from California to Texas used indigenous languages for translating and teaching the Catholic catechism to Native Americans. By the mid-19th century, private and public bilingual schools had include such native languages as Czech, Dutch, French, German, Norwegian, Spanish, and Swedish. Ohio became the first state in 1839, to adopt a bilingual education law, authorizing German-English instruction at parents' request. Louisiana enacted an identical provision for French and English in 1847, and the New Mexico Territory did so for Spanish and English in 1850. By the end of the 19th century, about a dozen states had passed similar laws. Elsewhere, many localities provided bilingual instruction without state sanction, in languages as diverse as Norwegian, Italian, Polish, Czech, and Cherokee. Beginning in 1959, public schools in Miami introduced bilingual programs. In 1968 the U.S., with Title VII of the Elementary and Secondary Education Act, or, informally, the Bilingual Education Act, Congress first mandated bilingual education in order to give immigrants access to education in their "first" language. The Act was amended in 1988. Federal spending on bilingual education jumped from $7.5 million in 1968 to $150 million by 1979.

A 1974 U.S. Supreme Court ruling, Lau v. Nichols, gave further momentum to bilingual education. Here, the Court held that San Francisco schools violated minority language students' rights when they educated students in the same classes as other students without special provisions.

Taken together, the Bilingual Education Act and the Lau v. Nichols ruling mandated that schools needed to at least provide some type of services to support English language learners, though neither specified what type of educational program needed to be provided. As such, both bilingual and English-only programs flourished after the law's passage and the court ruling.

The Bilingual Education Act was terminated in 2001 by new federal education policy, with the passage of No Child Left Behind by the U.S. Congress. This law offers no support for native language learning, but rather emphasized accountability in English only, and mandates that all students, including ELLs, are tested yearly in English.

The majority of U.S. high school students in the United States are required to take at least one to two years of a second language. The vast majority of these classes are either French or Spanish. In a large number of schools this is taught in a manner known as FLES, in which students learn about the second language in a manner similar to other subjects such as mathematics or science. Some schools use an additional method known as FLEX in which the "nature of the language" and culture are also taught. High school education almost never uses "immersion" techniques.

==== Controversy in the United States ====
In recent times there has been a lot of discussion about bilingual education. In the 2009 U.S. Supreme Court decision, Horne v. Flores, the majority opinion stated, "Research on ELL instruction indicates there is documented, academic support for the view that SEI (Structured English Immersion) is significantly more effective than bilingual education." Proponents of bilingual education claim that it is not only easier for students to learn English if they are literate in their first language, but that such students will learn English better and become bilingual and biliterate. One study shows that English language learners introduced to a transitional bilingual program gained a fair amount of English comprehension and reading skills. Proponents further claim that effective bilingual programs strive to achieve proficiency in both English and the students' home language. Dual language or Two-Way bilingual programs are one such approach, whereby half of the students speak English and half are considered English language learners (ELLs). The teacher instructs in English and in the ELLs' home language. The dual purpose of this type of classroom is to teach the children a new language and culture, and language diversity in such classrooms is seen as a resource. Programs in English only eradicate the native languages immigrants bring to this country, while dual language bilingual programs serve to maintain such languages in an "additive" context, where a new language is added without the first being lost. One paper states that two-way developmental bilingual education programs in elementary school have the most success in language minority students' long term academic achievement. These students will maintain their gains in academic performance in secondary level academic classes. Another study shows the positive results of a two-way bilingual education program. Another study suggests that the transitional bilingual education method can improve development of the native language without hindering the development of the English language.

Some mistakenly believe that once a student can converse in English (Basic interpersonal communication skills – BICS), they will naturally perform well academically (cognitive academic language proficiency – CALP) in English. It has been postulated that BICS and CALP are two different sets of skills. Opponents of bilingual education claim that students with other primary languages besides Spanish are placed in Spanish classes rather than taught in their native languages and that many bilingual education programs fail to teach students English. Critics of bilingual education have claimed that studies supporting bilingual education tend to have poor methodologies and that there is little empirical support in favor of it. The controversy over bilingual education is often enmeshed in a larger political and cultural context. Opponents of bilingual education are sometimes accused of racism and xenophobia. This is especially so in the case of such groups as English First, which is a conservative organization that promotes the stance that English should be the official language of the United States. In Milwaukee, Wisconsin and other cities, Minister of education of the Young Lords, Tony Baez and others held marches and other activities to promote bilingual education. Proponents of bilingual education are frequently accused of practicing identity politics, to the detriment of children and of immigrants.

"To aid and monitor the education of English language learners (ELL) through mother-tongue and English education, the federal government enacted the Bilingual Education Act (Title V11) of the elementary and secondary Education Act in 1968. As an offshoot of president Lyndon B. Johnson's war on poverty, the act strove to help disenfranchised language-miniority students, especially Hispanics. Unfortunately, the acts aims were somewhat ambiguous. As Crawford (2000a) writes 'enacted at the apex of the Great Society, bilingual education act of 1968 passed congress without a single dissent. Americans have spent the past 30 years debating what it was meant to accomplish'." (p. 107).

==== California ====
California is the state with the highest number of English learners (ELs) in the United States. One out of three students in California is an EL. In June 1998, Proposition 227 was passed by 61% of the California electorate. This proposition mandates that ELs be placed in structured English immersion for a period "not normally to exceed one year," then be transferred to mainstream classrooms taught "overwhelmingly in English." This proposition also gave parents the possibility to request alternative programs for their children, however, the availability of waivers and information to parents have been a challenge in the implementation of this proposition.

In 2000, the California Department of Education contracted with the American Institutes for Research (AIR) and WestEd to conduct a five-year evaluation of the effects of Proposition 227. The study methodology focused on "A combination of student achievement analysis, phone interviews, case study site visits, and written surveys was used to examine such questions as how the proposition was implemented, which EL services are most and least effective, and what unintended consequences resulted from Proposition 227's implementation."

The authors caution about the limitations in the statewide data. California does not have the capacity to link student academic progress over time across years; however, using student-level linked data over time from the Los Angeles Unified School District, and complementing that analysis with surveys, site visits and interviews, the study found "no conclusive evidence favoring one instructional program over another." Students who remained in bilingual education have similar academic growth trajectories when compared with students who switched to English immersion.

California, among other states, also has many public schools that have immersion programs, most commonly Spanish–English immersion but also including other languages. Immersion programs include native speakers of both languages and include instruction in both languages, with primary (grade) schools typically having 90% instruction in the minority language in the early grades, transitioning to 50% instruction in each of the minority language and English in the upper grades.

Proposition 227 was repealed in 2016 by California Proposition 58 (2016) with a majority of 73.52%.

==== Arizona ====
California was followed in 2000 by Arizona in the passage of similar legislation, Arizona Proposition 203, which ended several programs previously available to ESL students. Arizona was the first state to provide bilingual education in the 1960s.

==== Georgia ====
During the 1990s the state of Georgia increased its foreign-born population by 233%. That was the second-largest increase in the country, and Georgia is the sixth fastest-growing state in the United States. Georgia has the seventh-largest illegal immigrant population in the country; in the 2000 census 228,000 illegal immigrants lived in the state. During the 1980s and 1990s a labor shortage in the carpet industry contributed to a rapid increase in the Hispanic population of Whitfield County and surrounding areas. Today about 75% of the students in the Dalton (the hub of Whitfield County) public schools are Hispanic.

Erwin Mitchell, a local Dalton lawyer, founded the Georgia Project in 1996 to help teach the influx of Hispanic students who have moved into the Dalton public schools. The Georgia Project partners with the University of Monterrey in Monterrey, Mexico, to bring teachers from Mexico to Georgia schools. Sixty teachers from the University of Monterrey have taught in Georgia since 1997, and they typically teach for two to three years on H-1B visas. The Georgia Project also has a Summer Institute that trains American teachers to speak Spanish and learn about Mexican culture. The Georgia Project is a bilingual/bicultural program that is primarily funded from federal education appropriations.

==== Native American Reservations ====
Following similar First Nations' models to Canada, academic linguists throughout the United States are working closely with Native American reservations communities to establish immersion and second-language programs for a number of respective tribal languages including Navajo, Hopi, Cherokee, Ojibwe, Lakhota, and Sioux, among others. Due to the combination of often a violent and isolative relationship between European settlers and Native Americans, their languages and communities have suffered dramatically in terms of facing extreme endangerment or extinction. The success of these programmes is mixed, depending largely on how healthy the status of the language in question is.

However, English-medium education still remains most widely used. Native programs often suffer a lack of state support in terms of funding or encouragement due in large part to the strong preference towards a melting-pot society. Native American boarding schools, which enforced white American values and the English language were extensively used as late as the 1990s, and were notorious for implementing corporal punishment if a Native child was caught speaking his or her language or freely practicing their tribal faith.

To maintain the Native American language diversity, bilingual education institutions were established to retrieve the speaker population of specific languages. One of the successful cases is Cheyenne language. In the early 1970s, when federal Title VII programs, a bilingual education project, were introduced on Montana reservations, the number of Northern Cheyenne language speakers increased dramatically. In Busby, Montana, the pride of Native American students was primarily stimulated. Native American students learning under such a bilingual system became willing to speak the Cheyenne language in daily life and even developed a high English level. As a result, the bilingual education programs in Montana received almost 100 percent support on the reservation.

== South America ==
=== Argentina ===
There are many English–Spanish schools in Argentina. Several are in the provinces where the Irish who were part of the local elite used to live. While medium- to big-sized cities are likely to have several bilingual schools, bilingual education remains an exception rather than the norm and is generally reserved for the upper classes. There is not a nationally encompassing bilingual program available for public schools. Because of the ties that have historically bound private education to religious institutions, many of the bilingual schools in the country are Roman Catholic schools. For example, out of the three available bilingual schools in a medium-sized city such as Mar del Plata, two of them (Holy Mary of Northern Hills and Holy Trinity College) are practicing Roman Catholic schools.

There are three Welsh–Spanish bilingual schools in Chubut Province serving the Patagonian-Welsh community.

There are a small number of bilingual schools in other languages, including German, French, Italian or Hebrew. These schools are normally linked to the respective community.

== See also ==
- Multilingual education
- Language immersion
- Medium of instruction
