= Dual language =

Dual language is a form of education in which students are taught literacy and content in two languages. Most dual language programs in the United States teach in English and Spanish, but programs increasingly use a partner language other than Spanish, such as Arabic, Chinese, French, Hawaiian, Japanese, or Korean. Dual language programs use the partner language for at least half of the instructional day in the elementary years.

Dual language programs generally start in kindergarten or the first grade and extend for at least five years, but many continue into middle school and high school. The programs aim for bilingualism, the ability to speak fluently in two languages; biliteracy, the ability to read and write in two languages; academic achievement equal to that of students in non-dual language programs; and cross-cultural competence. Most dual language programs are located in neighborhood public schools, but many are charter, magnet, or private schools.

== History ==
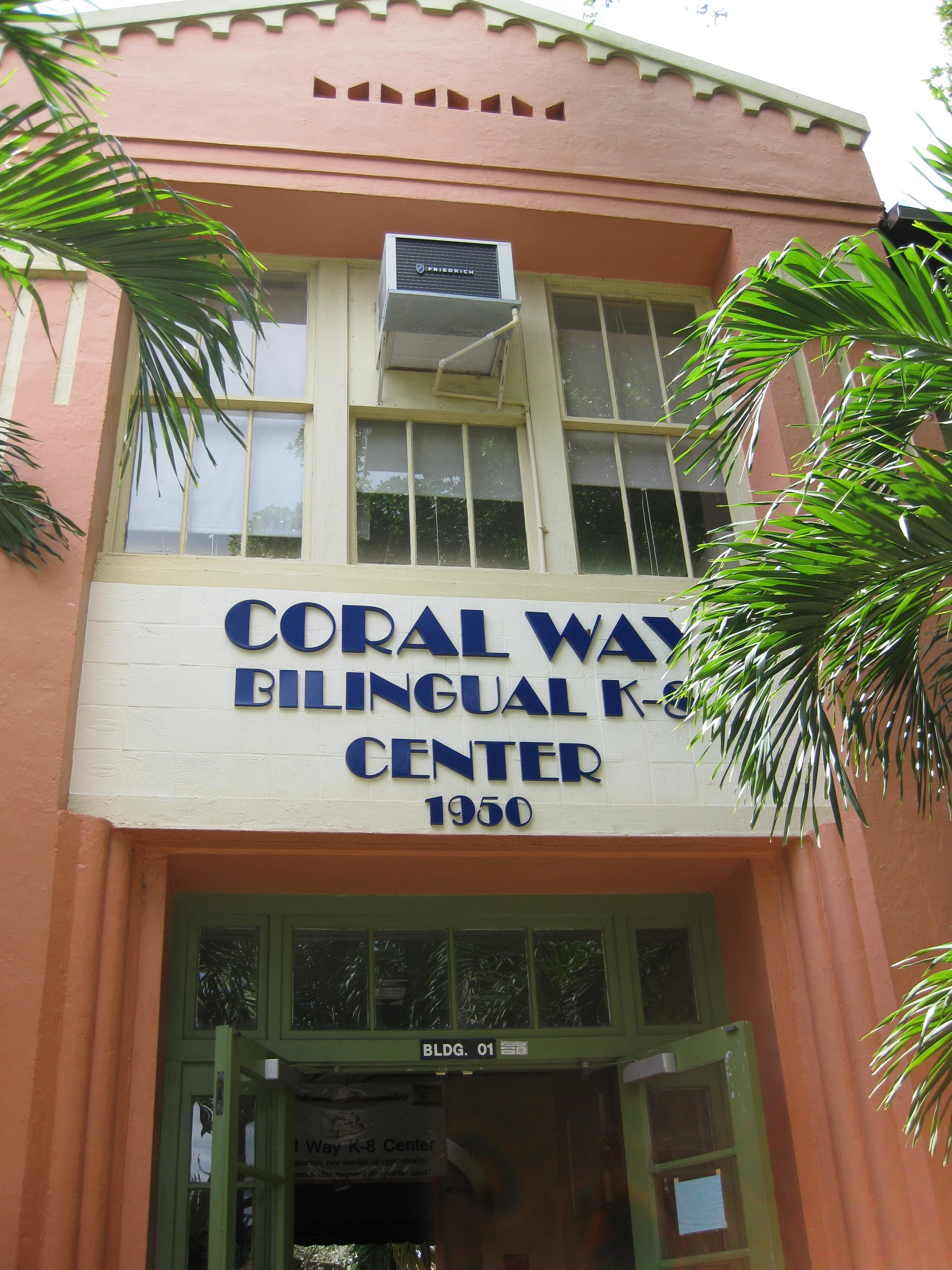
Coral Way Elementary, K-8 dual language school, Dade County, Florida

The initiation of dual immersion programs in the United States is characterized by the coalescence of local politicians and community members. Coral Way Elementary, a K-8 school in Dade County, Florida, is cited as the first two-way bilingual school, beginning in 1963. The program was started by Cuban citizens who were seeking refuge in Florida from the Castro regime and believed that their children would eventually return to Cuban schools. Fourteen more dual language bilingual schools were started in Dade County during the 1960s. The Ecole Bilingue, a French/English school in Massachusetts, was formed around the same time . In 1968, the passing of the Bilingual Education Act served to address the reality that Limited English Proficient (LEP) students were in need of proper instructional support to achieve academic gains and, in turn, provided federal funding for primary language instruction in local school districts . The Lau v. Nichols ruling of 1974 further affirmed a student's right to educational opportunity via appropriate instructional services. Schools were now charged with the mission to implement programs suitable to the needs of their language minority students.

The number of dual immersion programs remained relatively low throughout the mid-1980s, but later, more attention was given to the need to provide challenging, yet comprehensible, instruction to English language learners (ELLs), which triggered a substantial growth in the number of programs. In 2002, for example, the implementation of the English Language Acquisition, Language Enhancement, and Academic Achievement Act of the No Child Left Behind Act made it requisite that schools with large numbers of language-minority students provide instruction that facilitates their acquisition of English to perform well on standardized tests consequently . There are now 398 two-way immersion programs in 30 states and the District of Columbia.

The number of programs has increased significantly in the last decade, despite efforts made in states such as Arizona and California to eradicate bilingual education programs in favor of English-immersion, with the passing of Proposition 203 and Proposition 227, respectively. It is estimated that 94% of the dual immersion programs are Spanish/English, with the remaining 6% being Chinese/English, Navajo/English, Japanese/English, and Korean/English programs.

== Changes since first implementation ==
One of the most salient changes in the two-way immersion program since its inception has been its conversion from being centered predominately on aiding ELLs to develop fluency in English to striving for biliteracy, bilingualism, and biculturalism for all students participating. Although two-way immersion initially focused on supporting ELLs in their development and acquisition of English literacy skills, the need to develop bilingualism in an increasingly-globalized society has made the program appealing for many parents of children who are native speakers of English. Foreign-language education programs can provide native speakers of English with exposure to a second language, but TWI has the potential to help students achieve near fluency in a second language.

That suggests that such programs are not solely to ELLs to acquire English, but they aim to develop second language proficiency for native speakers of English. In fact, because two-way immersion requires almost an equal amount of native English-speakers and native Spanish-speakers, a lack of native English-speakers makes it unlikely that such programs will not be implemented. That implies that native Spanish-speakers may not receive the opportunity to take part in the dual immersion program (Gomez, 2005).

== Types ==
There are four main types of dual language programs, which mainly differ in the population:

1. Developmental, or maintenance, bilingual programs enroll primarily students who are native speakers of the partner language.
2. Two-way (bilingual) immersion programs enroll a balance of native English speakers and native speakers of the partner language.
3. Foreign language immersion, language immersion or one-way immersion enroll primarily native English-speakers.
4. Heritage language programs enroll mainly students who are dominant in English but whose parents, grandparents, or other ancestors spoke the partner language.

The term "dual language" is often used interchangeably with two-way immersion. Other variations on dual language include "dual language immersion," "dual immersion," and "dual enrollment". The term "bilingual education" has somewhat fallen out of favor among dual language practitioners but is still used to refer to any program that uses two languages for instruction.

Dual language programs are different from transitional bilingual programs, whose aim is to transition students out of their native language as quickly as possibly, usually within three years. That is sometimes referred to as "subtractive bilingualism" since the first language is typically lost as English is acquired. Dual language programs are considered to promote "additive bilingualism," students' primary language is developed and maintained as a second language is added.

Another type of program that is not considered dual language is foreign language education in which students receive less than half a day studying in the partner language and often study only language arts and literature in that language, as opposed to content area subjects, such as mathematics, science, and social studies.

== Variations ==
There are two main variations based on the amount of time spent in the partner language and the division of languages.

=== Amount of time spent in partner language ===
- Full immersion, or 90/10, programs teach in the partner language 90% of the time in the primary grades (usually kindergarten and the first grade) and 10% in English, and they gradually adjust the ratio each year until the partner language is used 50% and English is used 50% by third or fourth grade (sometimes later if the program extends to the eighth grade or beyond). On the other hand, 50/50 programs teach 50% of the day in English and 50% of the day in the partner language at all grade levels.
- Partial immersion programs teach less than 50% of the time and usually focus on one content area, usually language arts, math or science.

There is currently no research indicating that one method is preferable to another, but some research indicates that students who spend more time in the partner language do better in that language (Howard, Christian, & Genesee, 2003; Lindholm-Leary, 2001; Lindholm-Leary & Howard, in press) and that language minority students (in the US, those whose native language is not English) do better academically when their native language is supported and developed (Thomas & Collier, 1997; 2002).

Some schools like Arizona Language Preparatory, in Phoenix, Arizona, and Alicia R. Chacon Elementary School, in El Paso, Texas, include a third language for a full day or a small portion of the day at all grade levels. Arizona Language Preparatory offers two full days of Mandarin Chinese, two full days of Spanish, and one day of English. Arizona Language Preparatory is also the first school in the nation to send a delegation of "Mini Ambassadors" through Phoenix Sister Cities to Chengdu, China. Youth ambassador programs are typically done on the high school level. Arizona Language Preparatory also held the Country's first ever Mandarin Spelling Bee in Phoenix, Arizona on May 17, 2021.

Full immersion (90/10) programs typically begin literacy instruction for students in kindergarten and the first grade in the partner language and add formal literacy in English in second or third grade. Students do not need to relearn how to read in English since teachers help them transfer their literacy skills from one language to the other. Other 90/10 programs separate students by native language and provide initial literacy instruction in the native language, adding second language literacy by second or third grade. In partial immersion or 50/50 programs, initial literacy instruction is either provided simultaneously in both languages to all students, or students are separated by native language in order to receive initial literacy in his or her native language. Students receive their literacy instruction in their native language and once students are in second or third grade they are provided with the second language literacy instruction.

Dual language programs in middle school and high school often merge students from several dual language elementary schools and exist as programs within larger mainstream schools. They often offer dual language students the opportunity to take language arts and at least one content area in the partner language, and many prepare students to take the Advanced Placement exams.

=== Division of languages ===
- Language division by schedule: within any dual language program, students speak and study in one language at a time, and the times for each language are explicitly defined. There is great variation, however, in the specifics. In some programs, language alternates by day, by week, or several week periods. In other schools, students speak one language in the morning and the other language after lunch. After a designated amount of time (one, two, or more weeks), the morning and afternoon languages switch. Further variation includes programs where particular subjects are always taught in one language, due to resource availability. Within a given school or program, there may be different schedules for different grades, such as at the Amistad Dual Language School in New York City in which students alternate languages less frequently as they progress through the grades and establish stronger skills in both languages.
- Language division by instructor: a dual language program may use a self-contained or a side-by-side model. Self-contained programs have one teacher for one group of students in one classroom. The teacher transitions from one language to the other along with the students. Alternatively, side-by-side programs have two or more classrooms for each grade, and one teacher teaches in the partner language, and the other teacher teaches in the dominant language (English in the United States). The grade is divided into two groups of students, which trade classrooms and teachers according to an explicit schedule, whether daily or weekly. Finally, at some schools, two or more teachers may team teach in the same classroom, with each teacher using one language and a combination of whole group, small group, and independent activities facilitated by the teachers.

In the below table, Two-Way Dual Language Immersion is the only two-way program; the other three are one-way dual language programs.

Overview of the Key Attributes of Dual Language Education Programs From U.S. Department of Education
	Two-Way/Dual Language Immersion	World Language Immersion Programs	Developmental Bilingual Education Programs	Heritage Language Immersion Programs
Student Population Served	ELs and non-ELs (ideally 50% in each group, or a minimum of 33%)	Primarily English speakers; can include ELs and heritage speakers	ELs and former ELs only	Students whose families' heritage language is/was the partner language
Languages	English and the ELs' home (partner) language	English and a partner language	English and the ELs' home (partner) language	English and the heritage (partner) language
Staffing	One bilingual teacher, who teaches in both languages, or one teacher per language	One bilingual teacher for both languages, or one teacher per language	One bilingual teacher for both languages, or one teacher per language	One bilingual teacher for both languages (prevalent model)

In all programs, the following is true:

Time Allocation per Language: Primarily 50:50, or a combination that starts with more of the partner language (90:10, 80:20, and so on)

Language of Academic Subjects: Varies by program

Language Allocation: Language of instruction allocated by time, content area, or teacher

Duration of Program: Throughout elementary school, with some programs continuing at the second level

Size of Program: Strand or whole school

Overview of the Key Attributes of Dual Language Education Programs From U.S. Department of Education

== Potential Benefits of Dual Language in Educational Writing ==
With Dual Language Writing being implemented there are benefits that can come along with the individual which include increased comfort with Multilingual Identities, empowerment through language use, and linguistic understand. For instance those who are bilingual may find that they feel more comfortable with their Multilingual Identities in their academics, and be less hesitant using other languages they might speak in their academic writing. A way this can be kept exercised is by some educators striving to implement pedagogies that empower language use, to serve as a reminder to consider the broader context, encompassing not just the educational system but also the influence of families, communities, and various social networks. Although some educators in training may acquire more knowledge about nurturing verbal communication skills than about nurturing written communication skills. So it is vital that educators who recognize the influential role of language to keep the opportunity to enact crucial interventions through teaching methods and social engagements.

Many students who communicate using non-mainstream variants of English have experienced the interplay of dual languages for a significant portion of their lives. Consequently, they tend to possess a more advanced linguistic understanding compared to the majority of mainstream students, particularly in recognizing the nuances of language variation and its implications as a realm of power and influence.

== Instructions ==
Dual language programs vary in the kinds of instruction provided but generally implement many of the following features:

- language arts instruction in both program languages
- instruction on literacy skills like phonics and fluency along with opportunities to read literature in both languages
- sheltered instruction strategies in both languages
- ability grouping for targeted purposes, with frequent reassessment based on strengths and weaknesses on different skills
- separation of languages in which the teacher will speak only one language at a time without translating but allow students to use native language resources such as peers and bilingual dictionaries
- ample time for student interaction (such as the use of co-operative learning), allowing students to practice their new language skills with their peers

Dual language teachers also incorporate practices that should be in place in any classroom with linguistically diverse students:

- Teaching content so that it interests and challenges bilingual students
- Communicating high expectations, respect, and interest in each of their students
- Understanding the roles of language, race, culture, and gender in schooling
- Engaging parents and community in the education of their children
- Becoming knowledgeable about and developing strategies to educate bilingual students and to communicate with their families
- Seeking and obtaining the professional development needed to engender those attitudes, knowledge bases, and specific instructional skills (Garcia, 2005).

In lesson planning, dual language teachers should focus on creating lessons that do the following:

- Proceed from whole to part
- Are learner-centered
- Have meaning and purpose for students and connection to their present lives
- Engage groups of students in social interaction
- Develop both oral and written language
- Show faith in the learner to expand students potential (Freeman & Freeman, 1994)

Other important tips for educators teaching bilingual or multilingual students include organizing content around themes, providing students with choice, starting the learning process with students questions, and exposing students to professional published books and magazines but also student-authored literature (Freeman & Freeman, 1994).

=== American programs ===
- Arizona Language Preparatory School (Phoenix, Arizona)
- Key Elementary School in Arlington, VA
- Saint Sebastian School , West Los Angeles
- Shuang Wen School in New York City
- Shuang Wen Academy Network in New York City
- Amistad Dual Language School in New York City
- High School for Dual Language & Asian Studies in New York City
- Escuela de Guadalupe in Denver, CO
- The International School in Portland, OR
- Coral Way Bilingual K-8 Center in Miami, FL
- Inter-American Magnet School in Chicago, IL
- Otay Ranch High School in Chula Vista, CA
- Rancho Del Rey Middle School in Chula Vista, CA
- Chula Vista Learning Community Charter (CVLCC)
- Barnard Asian Pacific Language Academy in San Diego, CA
- Nuestro Mundo Community School in Madison, WI
- Independence Elementary School in Lewisville, TX

• First Programs in California: River Glen Elementary School in San Jose, CA • Buena Vista International School in San Francisco, CA • San Diego Language Academy in San Diego, CA • Edison Immersion School in Santa Monica - Malibu, CA

For names of more dual language programs not profiled in Wikipedia, see The Directory of Two-Way Bilingual Programs in the U.S. or The Directory of Foreign Language Immersion Programs in U.S. Schools German/American Elementary School, Houston, Texas

=== See also - others ===
- French immersion

== Effectiveness ==
Two-way immersion has been referred to as the most effective bilingual program contributing to long-term academic success (Howard et al. 2003, p. 24). Thorough planning and effective implementation are crucial to the success of TWI programs, in addition to ample support from administrators and access to quality resources. In well-implemented programs, ELLs have achieved higher academic success than their peers in other bilingual programs (Dorner, 2011). Effective implementation lies in the duration of the program. To produce academic achievement, students ideally must be enrolled in TWI programs for four to seven years (Howard et al. 2003, p. 24). Students participating in TWI programs for this length of time have been shown to demonstrate higher academic performance than their peers in English-immersion programs (Howard et al. 2003, p. 24). On the contrary, students who receive little to no instruction in their native language, during their elementary years, struggle to attain grade level performance in the target language (Cobb, 2006).

Both Native English Speakers (NES) and ELLs are beneficiaries of the gains made through TWI. The juxtaposed use of the majority and minority language in TWI programs can enable children to transfer skills from the secondary language to their primary language and vice versa (Scanlan, 2009). Research comparing the academic achievement made by native speakers of English and native speakers of Spanish illustrates that while both groups show growth in their native and secondary language, English native speakers are more dominant in their primary language, but Spanish native speakers are able to achieve a more balanced form of bilingualism, that is, relatively equal in their ability to communicate orally and in writing in their primary and secondary language (Howard et al. 2003, p. 36).

The evidence of the effectiveness of TWI is consistent in programs where less common languages are maintained as well. For example, an eight-year study of the Navajo/English two-way bilingual program at the Rough Rock Community School in northeastern Arizona confirms that those students who received thorough instruction in their native language as well as the target language encountered more success in school than their peers in English-only programs. Such students too showed progress in both languages in their writing abilities on local and national measures.

In addition to quantitative measures of effectiveness, research has further credited the two-way immersion model as creating more unified communities in public schools amongst parents and caregivers since speakers of both majority and minority languages are grouped together in an effort to develop literacy skills in both languages and consequently foster cross-cultural relationships in both cultures (Scanlan, 2009). Furthermore, studies have shown that high school students who attended schools with two-way bilingual programs were more motivated and passionate about attaining higher-level education (Cobb, 2006).

Dual Language Immersion programs may be inefficient in the education of language-minority students. Issues are raised in the quality of instruction in the minority language, the effects of dual immersion and intergroup relations, and, how Dual Language immersion programs fit into the relationship between language and power of children and society (Valdes, 1997).

While such examples attest to the effectiveness of the TWI model, these programs are often voluntary which signifies the inherent difficulty in making comparisons across programs. Academic success and biculturalism may be attributed to the quality of the TWI program, however, may also be ascribed to external factors such as a student's inherent qualities or socioeconomic status. Thus, while standardized test scores, from a policy perspective, are often used to determine the effectiveness of a program, other elements may impact the academic success achieved by many students in the TWI program.
