= Oakland International High School =

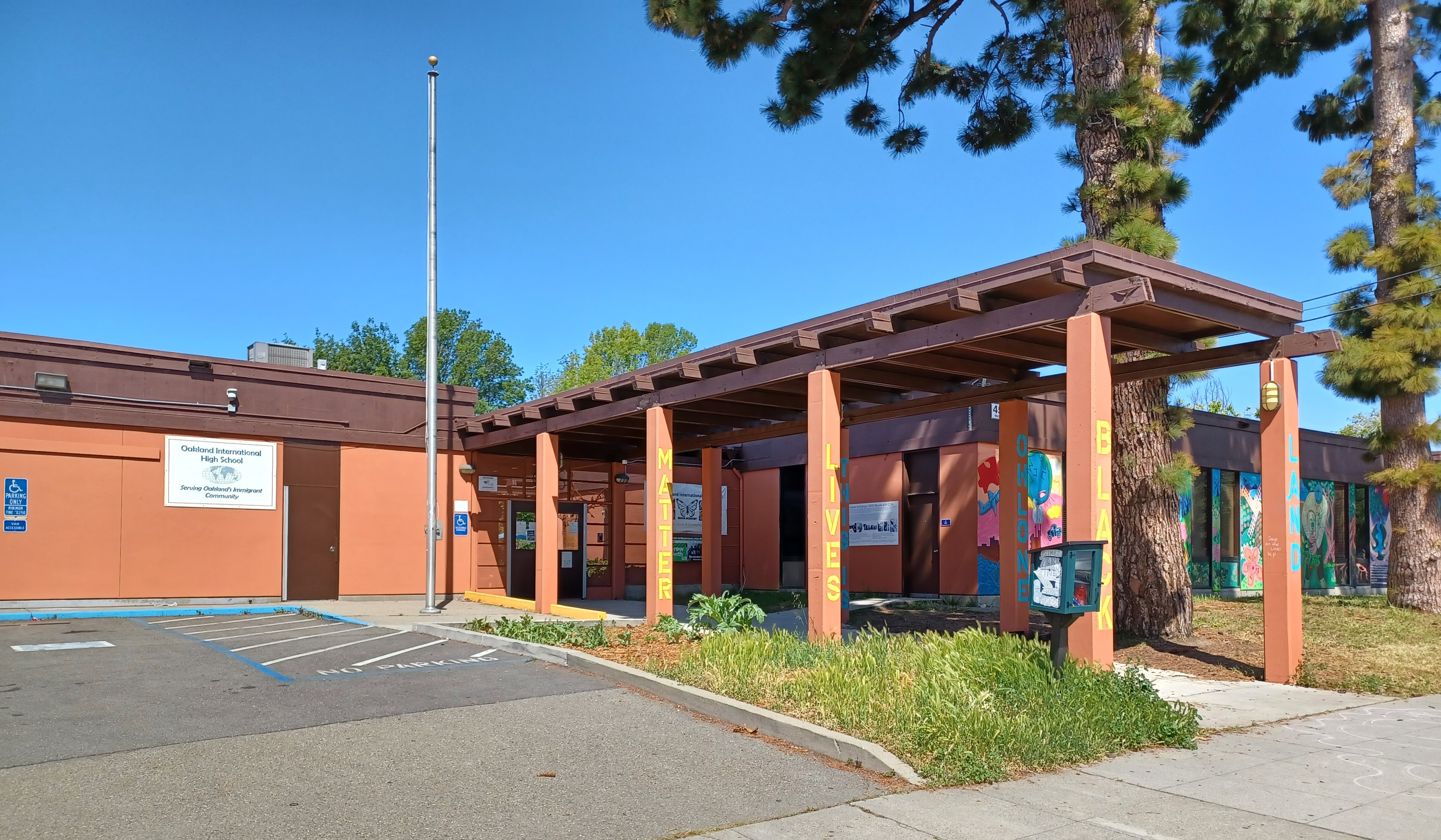

Location
- 4521 Webster Street; Oakland, California 94609-2140; United States

Information
- Type: Public high school
- Established: 2007
- School district: Oakland Unified School District
- Principal: Carmelita Reyes
- Teaching staff: 24.45 (FTE)
- Grades: 9–12
- Enrollment: 290 (2023-2024)
- Student to teacher ratio: 11.86
- Nickname: OIHS
- Website: oaklandinternational.ousd.org

Oakland International High School opened in August 2007 with the support of The Internationals Network for Public Schools, Oakland Unified School District, and the Bill and Melinda Gates Foundation. The school targets a population of students, newly arrived immigrants, who have historically been under-served nationally, in California, and in Oakland.

== History ==
OIHS is a member of The Internationals Network for Public Schools, a non-profit organization that grew out of the work of a group of international high schools in New York City. It now supports 12 schools in New York and California. The first international high school, located on the campus of LaGuardia Community College, opened in 1985; two more followed in the 1990s. Since 2001, the network has opened and supported nine additional high schools with the help of the Bill and Melinda Gates Foundation. The network of schools annually serves 4,000 students immigrating from 90 countries. The network's mission is to provide quality education to recently arrived immigrants by developing and interconnecting small high schools based on the Internationals approach.

== Site ==
The school campus is the former Verdese Carter Middle School, built in the 1970s. The site formerly served as Woodrow Wilson Junior High School from 1926.

== Mission ==
The mission of OIHS is to provide newly arrived immigrants a quality alternative education focused on English language acquisition in preparation for college.

== Students ==
100% of the student body is made up of English language learners, nearly all of whom immigrated to the US in the last four years. Collectively, students speak over 30 languages other than English. Students have come from over three dozen countries: Afghanistan, Brazil, Bhutan, Burma, Cambodia, China, Congo, Côte d'Ivoire (Ivory Coast), Cuba, Gabon, Germany, Ghana, Guatemala, El Salvador, Eritrea, Ethiopia, Haiti, Honduras, India, Iraq, Japan, Liberia, Macau, Mexico, Mongolia, Morocco, Nepal, Nicaragua, Nigeria, Peru, Philippines, Russia, South Korea, Sri Lanka, Thailand, Ukraine, Uzbekistan, Vietnam, and Yemen. 52% of students are Latino, 6% African, 36% Asian, and 6% Arab or White. Approximately 25% of students hold refugee immigration status, having escaped ethnic conflicts in Liberia, Nepal, Burma, and Central Asia. More than 90% of the student body qualifies for free or reduced-price lunch. Approximately 97.2% of students are socioeconomically disadvantaged.

To promote a sense of community and support, class sizes are kept small, holding only 25 students or fewer. The total enrollment for the school in the 2017–2018 academic year was 360 students, maintaining a maximum of 100 students per grade level. In their freshman and sophomore years, students at OIHS are kept within a tight circle of the same four teachers who strengthen their basic English skills. As upperclassmen, students are acquainted with new teachers and are given the opportunity to participate in internships at local businesses, government bureaus, and community service programs.

== Curriculum ==
Experts conclude that we must infuse our textbooks with information from the minority perspective, instead of incorporating a few instances of it into a white history book, placing an emphasis on culturally relevant teaching. Teachers at Oakland International High School incorporate many aspects of the students' culture into the everyday curriculum. Additionally, the school organizes "Community Walks" in which students become the teachers and educate the staff on their cultural backgrounds and customs. These Community Walks include the sharing of cultural dishes and visits to local ethnic enclaves such as grocery stores and churches.

Bilingual education was barred from the classroom in 1998 by California Proposition 227, but these restrictions were repealed by California Proposition 58 when it passed in 2016. In support of this, Professor Ofelia García of the Graduate Center of the City University of New York, argued that dynamic (meaning-making) bilingualism which integrates culture and language together in the classroom can yield more desirable results in both the short and long term than complete immersion in an English-only classroom. In the ongoing debate on bilingual education, OIHS chooses to implement an immersion approach, despite scholarly evidence that supports transitional and bilingual education models. Although OIHS is advertised as an English immersion school, language support from teachers, volunteers, and even other students is encouraged. Furthermore, teachers are trained on the refugee experience and its various narratives in order to best educate their students and help with the resettlement of these populations. Refugees may or may not have had formal education prior to arriving in the American classroom.

=== Internationals approach ===
OIHS teachers are trained in the Internationals Approach to teach students to improve their speaking, writing, and reading skills in English. This approach is built on the belief that English-language acquisition is best fostered in an academic environment in which students participate in 1) heterogeneous groups, using 2) a project-based curriculum, and where 3) English development is integrated into all content areas. Working in small groups, students learn academic content, art, music and technology through exciting, rigorous, hands-on projects as they learn their new language.

== Modern context ==
25,000 new refugee students enter the U.S. public education system each year. OIHS was founded in 2007, preceding the year 2008 when the United States received 70% of the world's refugees equating to 60,190 people. These figures reflect the fact that about half of the world's refugee population are minors. Through the Refugee Act, refugees upon arrival in the U.S. receive eight months of medical and cash assistance; however services for youth refugees are limited, even in schools which have been proven to be the most stable and effective institution of support for refugee families.
