= SLEP =

SLEP may refer to:

- Sleeper Either Class with Pantry, British Rail sleeping carriages with 24-beds
- Secondary Level English Proficiency test
- Shelf Life Extension Program of the Food and Drug Administration and U.S. Department of Defense
- Service Life Extension Program describes an extension or upgrade of an asset of the government, usually the U.S. military or NOAA
