= EISP =

EISP may refer to:

- English for Integrated Studies Project
- The English International School of Padua
- English International School Prague
- Exercise-induced sexual pleasure
