= Life extension (disambiguation) =

Life extension is the idea of extending the human lifespan.

Life extension may also refer to:

- Life Extension Foundation, a nonprofit organization that sells supplements and vitamins
  - Alcor Life Extension Foundation, a nonprofit organization based in Scottsdale, Arizona, USA, that advocates, researches, and performs cryonics
- Life Extension: A Practical Scientific Approach, a 1982 book by Durk Pearson and Sandy Shaw
- Life Extension Society, a cryonics organization
- Life Extension Institute, an organization with the goal of prolonging human life through hygiene and disease prevention
- LifeExtension PS Caps, a trade name for Phosphatidylserine.
- Shelf Life Extension Program, a joint program of the United States Department of Defense and the Food and Drug Administration that aims to reduce the cost to the military of maintaining stockpiles of certain pharmaceuticals by researching the expiration of drugs

== See also ==
- Outline of life extension
- Index of topics related to life extension
