= Transitional bilingual =

Transitional bilingual may refer to:

- Transitional bilingual education, the practice of educating students in their native language before teaching a second language
- Transitional bilingualism, the generational process of changing the primary language spoken
