= Transitional bilingual education =

Transitional bilingual education is a bilingual education model that is designed to support English learners by using students’ home language for academic instruction while they gradually transition to English-medium instruction. This is in contrast to total immersion bilingual education in which students are directly immersed in the second language. Transitional bilingual education is among those most commonly implemented in public schools across the United States. The application of transitional bilingual education in the United States ultimately resulted from an effort to officially recognize Chicano and Latino identities with the passage of the Bilingual Education Act.

A bilingual teacher teaches children in subjects such as math, science, and social studies in their native language so that once the transition is made to an English-only classroom, the student has the knowledge necessary to compete with his peers in all other subject areas. Transitional Bilingual Education programs are introduced in kindergarten and can continue up to grade six or seven. English as a second language courses are sometimes incorporated to provide supplemental instruction.

Transitional bilingual education programs are divided into two categories: early-exit and late-exit. Early-exit programs begin with strong support in the students' native language; nevertheless, this support is rapidly diminished. Late-exit programs, on the other hand, maintain strong support in the primary language. The fundamental difference between these two models is the length of the program.

== Early-exit transitional bilingual education ==
The main goal of early-exit programs is to expedite the acquisition of the second language so that language learners can be integrated into classrooms with native speakers. Less emphasis is placed on progress made in other subjects. There is not much importance assigned to the continued development of first-language skills. After one to three years in the program, students are expected to have acquired enough knowledge in the second language to be transferred to classes in which only the second language is used as a medium of instruction. In early-exit programs, a near-native proficiency in the target language is required of instructors. Institutions may vary in the amount of first-language instruction that is utilized. The degree to which the children's first language is spoken in the classroom depends on the proficiency level of the students, who generally require more instruction in their mother tongue at earlier ages. In kindergarten, the average length of instruction in the first language is approximately one hour each day. The amount of time spent teaching in the first language is greatly reduced in grades 1 and 2. Students are first instructed in the grammar and composition of the first language, for it is claimed that knowledge of the first language aids the acquisition of knowledge in the second language. They may also be instructed in the language arts of both first and second languages simultaneously. Instruction in reading in the second language doesn't typically begin until students meet the standards for reading in their first language. The students' primary language is used to a lesser extent in the instruction of other subjects. As students make progress in the second language, it becomes increasingly incorporated into the curriculum, gradually taking the place of the first language. Cultural knowledge is imparted through classroom activities and materials.

== Late-exit transitional bilingual education ==
The focus of late-exit programs is to ensure understanding of all content areas while maintaining use of the students' native language, allowing a greater transitional period during which students acquire the second language at a slower pace. As is the case with early-exit programs, teachers in late-exit programs are required to have native-like proficiency in the second language. Likewise, both languages are used in the classroom, although a minimum of half of the class time is to be spent using the students' first language. Unlike early-exit programs, instruction in content areas is primarily conducted in the first language. Students receive instruction in the language arts of their native tongue before being introduced to those of the target language. A key difference between early- and late-exit programs is that late-exit programs generally span five to seven years, whereas students may be released from early-exit programs in as little as one to two years. Again, cultural knowledge is transmitted through classroom activities and materials. It is commonly held by proponents of the late-exit strategy that prolonged instruction in one's native tongue provides the student with a greater understanding of its structure, which through contrastive analysis can be used to gain more information regarding the second language.

== Issues in transitional bilingual education ==
In many transitional bilingual education programs, language ideologies can greatly influence children's learning outcomes. A student's intelligence is often equated with his or her level of proficiency in the second language. Teachers with assimilationist ideologies often encourage students to abandon their native language as it is thought to have little value if any. Instructors may be more inclined to reduce the amount of instruction in the students' native language because they believe that the easiest way to transition to the second language is through consistent use of that language. Another issue encountered in TBE classrooms is that instructors seldom provide an environment in which students can produce the target language.

== Status ==
Research has shown that many of the skills learned in the native language can easily be transferred to the second language later. This research reflects greater academic progress made by students in Transitional Bilingual Education programs in comparison with those enrolled in many English as a Second Language (ESL) programs.

However, research have also showed that transitional bilingual education programs are ineffective when compared to immersion bilingual education programs, such as dual-language immersion and total immersion. As a result, California, Arizona, and Massachusetts are required by law use the Structured English Immersion, a total immersion program, rather than transitional bilingual education programs common elsewhere in the United States.
