= King George School (Calgary, Alberta) =

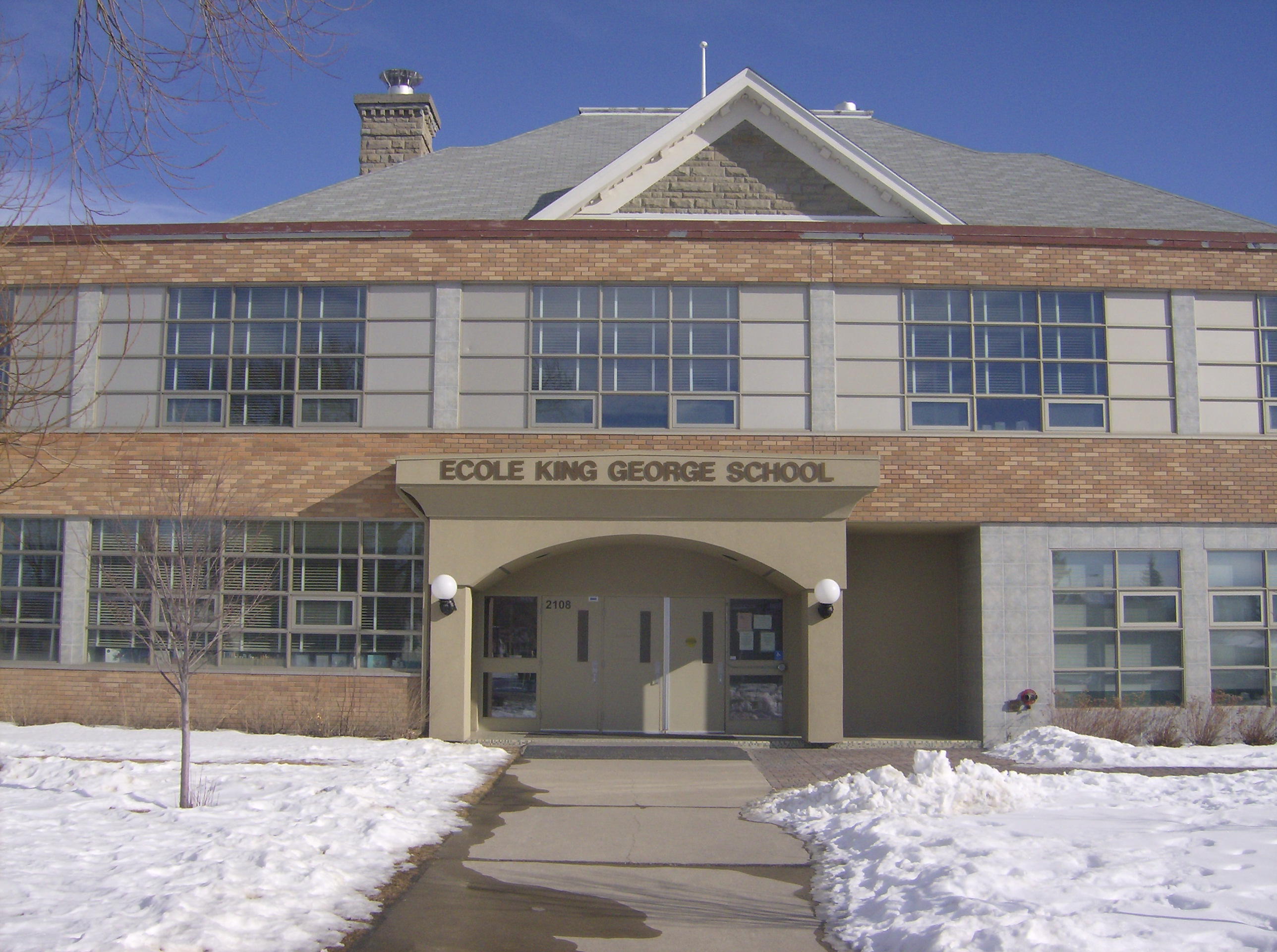

Location
- 2108 -10 Street N.W., Calgary, Alberta; Calgary, Alberta, T2M 3M4; Canada; 51.0709°N 114.084°W

Information
- School type: Public
- Motto: with these hands, with these hearts, with these minds we can do anything!
- School board: Calgary Board of Education
- Area trustee: George Lane
- Principal: Maryse Samson
- Grades: K-6
- Enrollment: 377 (September 2006)
- Language: English, French Immersion
- Area: Area II
- Website: school.cbe.ab.ca/school/KingGeorge/Pages/default.aspx

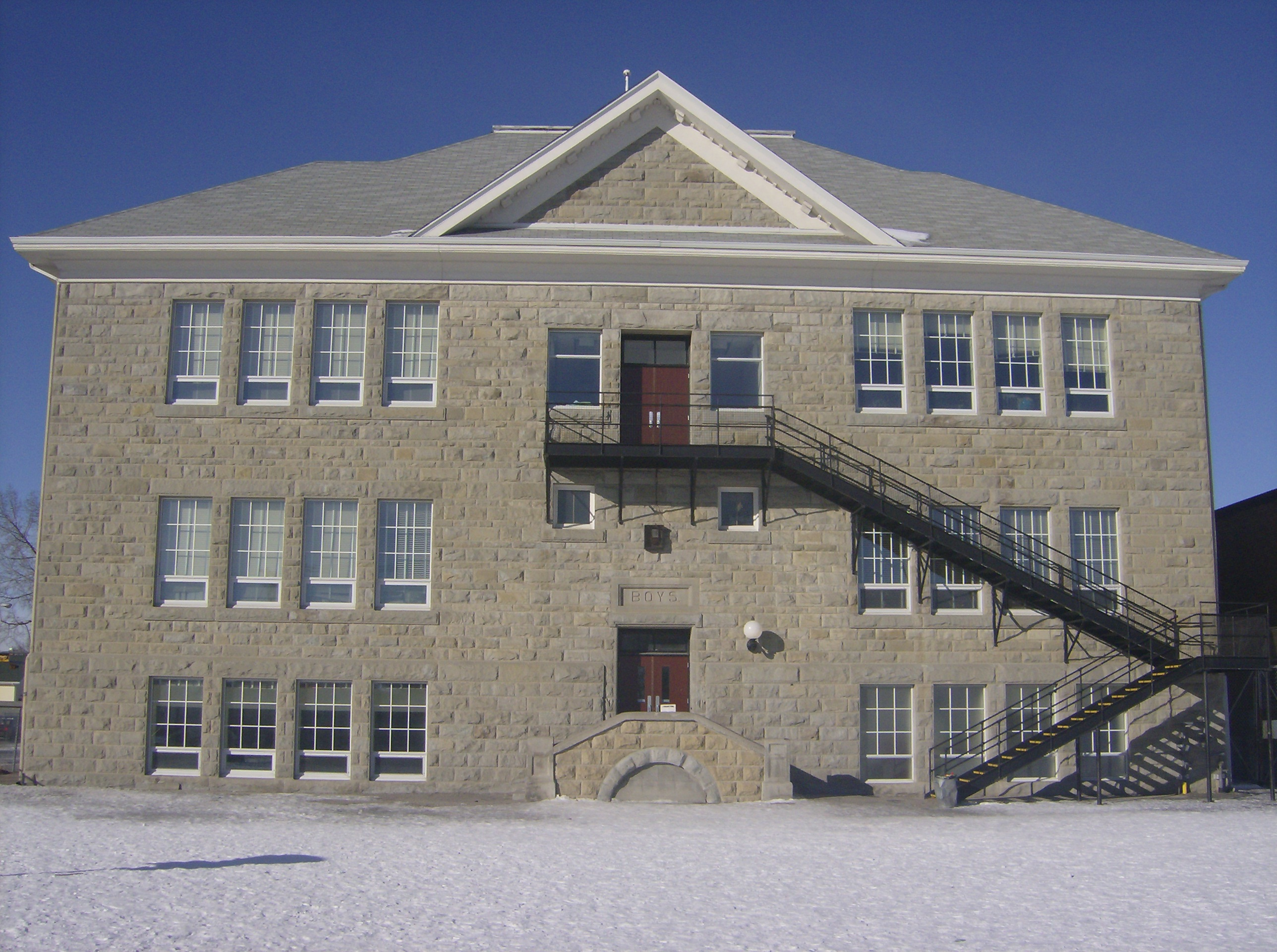
Original sandstone building opened in 1913 is now the back of the school

King George School (KGS) is a public French immersion elementary school in Calgary, Alberta, Canada. It is operated by the Calgary Board of Education (CBE).

== Shared building ==
The school offers many programs and activities, with many theme days all chosen by class representatives, who meet every month to discuss current school issues. Representatives bring up topics discussed from their homeroom class, to listen and take action the suggestions of the students. TLC offers a special character education program, which features virtues that the school encourages students to take into their daily lives by. Each month a different virtue is selected, and a special half-period is spent each day before lunch ('Character Circle') to discuss that, doing activities as well fitting with the course.

However, next year, the TLC program has been decided and finalized to move out of the King George building, and into Balmoral School - at last having its own independent building to reside in.

It now carries the Mandarin project from Langevin.

== History ==
The school name was selected to honor the 1910 coronation of George V of the United Kingdom. The school was built in 1912, and was opened in 1913. As was typical of the time in Calgary, the original structure was made from sandstone.

From then until 1988 it operated as a regular English language school, for the nearby community (teaching grades K-9 before the end point). However, as young families moved to outer lying areas in the city, enrollment tapered off, and there was progressively more bussing of students from newer communities that didn't have their own school yet.

In September 1987 the school became a dual-track English and French immersion elementary school. In 2002, continued declining enrollment, meant the school was turned into a single-track French immersion program.

== French immersion ==
French immersion is generally for students from English language families, who wish their children to speak French fluently. The primary language of instruction in most courses is French, although English is taught as a separate course. Students are expected to be, or become, fluent in both languages. French speaking families who wish their children to have a fully French education, will often prefer instead to go to a school run by the French language school district instead (as opposed to the CBE which is English).

== See also ==
- Royal eponyms in Canada
