= Structured English Immersion =

Language teaching method

Structured English Immersion (SEI) is a total immersion bilingual education technique for rapidly teaching English to English language learners. The term was coined by Keith Baker and Adriana de Kanter in a 1983 recommendation to schools to make use of Canada's successful French immersion programs. The Canadian model was developed to encourage bilingualism through immersing Anglophones in the minority language and replaced many English-only laws in various Canadian provinces before the 1960s, while in the United States the same approach was advocated to force minority speakers to adopt English.

More recently, SEI has been defined as a methodology in which English language learners (ELLs) learn English through structured and sequential lessons. Specially developed for ELLs, these lessons are based, to a large degree, on the mainstream curricula.

In a 2009 U.S. Supreme Court decision, Horne v. Flores, the majority opinion stated, "Research on ELL instruction indicates there is documented, academic support for the view that SEI is significantly more effective than [transitional] bilingual education. Findings of the Arizona State Department of Education in 2004 strongly support this conclusion." The chairman of the Center for Equal Opportunity, Linda Chavez, praised the Supreme Court ruling, noting "the failure of bilingual education in performing the number-one job of our public schools, which is to teach children English so they can succeed in 21st century America." SEI is mandatory in California, Arizona and Massachusetts where voter initiatives opted to restrict the use of bilingual education in preference for SEI.

== SEI framework ==
Only Arizona mandates that its public schools implement SEI models as follows:

- Significant amounts of the school day are dedicated to the explicit teaching of the English language, and students are grouped for this instruction according to their level of English proficiency.
- "The English language is the main content of SEI instruction. Academic content plays a supporting, but subordinate, role."
- "English is the language of instruction; students and teachers are expected to speak, read, and write in English."
- "Teachers use instructional methods that treat English as a foreign language."
- "Students learn discrete English grammar skills."
- "Rigorous time lines are established for students to exit from the program."
- SEI program graduates continue to receive support services until they are reclassified as "fluent English proficient" whereby federal law then requires students be monitored for two years after reclassification.

== SEI by state ==
In Arizona, where SEI is required of all schools in the state, all textbooks, materials, and assessments used in an SEI classroom must be aligned to the Arizona K-12 English Language Learner Proficiency Standards and the Discrete Skills Inventory. The Arizona English Language Learner Assessment (AZELLA) is used to measure English proficiency of SEI students in Arizona.
