= The International School =

Coordinates: 45°30′24″N 122°40′37″W

International School of Portland

Location
- 2305 S Water Ave; Portland, (Multnomah County), Oregon 97201; United States

Information
- Type: Private
- Opened: 1990
- Grades: PK-5
- Colors: Navy and white
- Mascot: Owl
- Website: Official website

The International School of Portland (I.S.P.) is an independent International Baccalaureate Chinese, Spanish and Japanese immersion preschool and elementary school in Portland, Oregon. The International School of Portland was founded in 1990 and today educates nearly 400 students in these languages and in English. It consistently receives an A+ ranking by Niche (company) and 4.9/5 stars on GreatSchools.

The International School of Portland is one of only two schools in the United States – and perhaps the world – offering full immersion in three separate language tracks under one roof.

It is home to the longest-running Chinese immersion program in the Pacific Northwest. Established in 1997 with twelve students, it is the 8th oldest program in the United States.

It is home to the premier Japanese language program in the United States. It was one of the first programs in the country to offer full Japanese language immersion. It is the only program to combine Japanese immersion with the renowned International Baccalaureate approach.

The International School of Portland is an authorized International Baccalaureate (IB) school, teaching children through the IB's inquiry-based Primary Years Programme. Authorized in 2010, it was the first elementary school in the Pacific Northwest to offer the International Baccalaureate Primary Years Programme (IB PYP).

The International School of Portland has been designated as an International Spanish Academy, one of only 28 American schools to earn this designation from the Ministry of Education and Science of Spain.

The International School of Portland's summer camp offers language immersion camps for children who are beginner through advanced speakers of Spanish, Mandarin, or Japanese. It consistently ranks among the Top Summer Camps awards by local parent publications, including NW Kid Magazine's Top Summer Camp in the Academic and/or Language categories for eight years in a row.

== History ==
The school was founded in 1990 by Doug and Frey Stearns. The school started by offering full Spanish immersion in 1990, full Japanese immersion starting in 1995, and full Chinese immersion starting in 1996.

In 2006, The International School of Portland expanded its campus to accommodate increased enrollment.

In 2010, the school became the first elementary school in the Pacific Northwest approved to teach the International Baccalaureate program. The campus, located on the SW Waterfront near downtown Portland, currently consists of six buildings. The newest, Learners' Hall, a 2-storey building with 14,000 square feet (1,300 m^{2}) was completed in 2016.

In 2016, the International School of Portland was awarded 4th place in the Ministry of Spain's ISA’s Academic Excellence in Spanish Competition. The contest recognizes North American K-12 schools for excellence in the implementation of an integrated learning methodology of content and language in Spanish. the International School of Portland was the only private school recognized out of the seven elementary, middle, and high schools on the list.
