= The English International School of Padua =

Location
- Via Egidio Forcellini 164/168; Padua; Italy

Information
- Type: International school International Baccalaureate
- Established: 1987
- Founder: Lucio Rossi
- Principal: Giulio Rossi
- Website: http://www.eisp.it

The English International School of Padua (EISP) is a private independent international school located in Padua, Italy. It enrolls students from pre-school to grade 12 and comprises 3 departments:

- Nursery 12 months-3
- Early Years 3-6
- Elementary 6-11
- Secondary 11-18

The curriculum followed is based upon both the Italian and the British national curricula until grade 8, and on the IGCSE programme for grades 9 and 10. Certified by Cambridge International Examinations. The final two years prepare students for the International Baccalaureate Diploma (IB). EISP is an IB world school and an ECIS member and is also qualified to carry out SAT examinations.

The school has approximately 800 students and 130 teaching staff.
