= English for Integrated Studies =

English for Integrated Studies (EIS) is a new model of bilingual education first introduced in the Kingdom of Thailand.

In 2004, the EIS project Thai teachers instruct their classes (Science, Mathematics, Computer and English: STEM) using English as a medium of instruction (EMI) with STEM English multi-media. The low amounts of tuition fees paid by students' parents are used to train the Thai teachers and STEM English textbooks to use English as a medium of instruction. Then Teachers improve their communicative English and Teaching technique skills by on-the-job training (OJT) from their instruction and students improve their English language skills in the new created English environment. EIS learning approach is based on a mix of applying the educationist Bruner, psychologist Vygotsky, bilingual education of Stephen Krashen theory through developing with Human Resource Development (HRD) theory to relate with the Sufficiency Economy Philosophy (SEP) of His Majesty King Bhumipol Adulyadej. The mix of developing a human being in the aspects of economic, system and psychology with respect to the spiritual aspect of Thai culture; reasonableness, moderation and self-immunity creates sustainable knowledge and it will ensure that the teachings of Buddha will be maintained.

== History ==
The MBP (mini bilingual program) similar to the new EIS-project idea was first introduced at Makudmuang Rachawittayalai School. It was conducted for solving the problem from hiring the foreign teachers. It then became the main English program at the school but somehow couldn't meet the parents’ expectations because Makudmuang Rachawittayalai School was already an English bilingual school for a long period of time. Therefore, most teachers as well as most parents had a wrong picture of the EIS-project. It was thought to be some kind of reduced low-cost English program. Surapong Ngamsom, the researcher of EIS, then initiated the program at Sunthonphu Pittaya Secondary School (SPSS), a school for poor and less-privileged children located in Rayong Province, Thailand. Since the second term of the academic year of 2004, EIS is successfully integrated into the school's curriculum. In the year of 2009 over 30 primary and secondary schools participated in the EIS project, already showing first success in Thai education. In 2010 the Rayong Provincial Administration Organization presented the construction of the new Mattayom Taksin Rayong School in Rayong city which employs the SME (Science-Math-English program) originated from the EIS project.

Nowadays, the Ministry of Education of Thailand got interested and introduced to start the EIS-project on 500 new schools in Thailand. The Principal of Sunthonphu Pittaya Secondary School goes to several conferences about new teaching methods, such as the ""Quality Innovations for Teaching and Learning" in The 4th World Teachers' day in Thailand and 12th UNESCO- APEID International Conference".

== Original idea of EIS ==
EIS was specifically designed to help less-privileged children in remote areas within the Kingdom of Thailand. It combines the study of the English language with minimum expense. Students pay a little tuition fee mainly to educate Thai teachers to develop the skill of teaching English as well as to provide an English environment which makes it easier to study the language. The English environment is created through teaching the core subjects, such as mathematics, science, computer and English, in English language. While English Program (EP) offer a good learning environment to only a few students, the schools tend to demand a large amount of money for the students’ tuition fees, putting them out of reach for most Thai families especially the ones living in remote areas. Most of Thai households cannot afford to send their children to EP schools to learn the second language. EIS, therefore, provides bilingual educational opportunities to students who otherwise struggle to afford it. Added to that idea Sunthonphu Pittaya Secondary School tries to intensify the English environment by hosting international volunteers who help the Thai teachers as teacher assistants. So far, the school hosted three AFS teacher assistants from Germany and China.

== EIS results ==
EIS successfully improved the student's results in the Thai National Test (O-Net).

== See also ==
- Bilingualism in Canada
- Bilingual Education Act
- English language learning and teaching
- National Association for Bilingual Education
- Bilingual education

== Resources ==
• Ngamsom, Surapong. (2004). Educational Report: Bilingual Curriculum Project Development at Makutmungrachawittayalai Secondary School, Rayong. Academic Work of School Administrator Class 9, Copied papers.

• Ngamsom, Surapong. (2006). A New Model for Bilingual Education; English for Integrated Studies Curriculum, A Case Study at SPSS.

• Ngamsom, Surapong. (2007). Effectiveness of English for Integrated Study Model for Rayong Municipality Primary School in Rayong Province, Thailand

• Ngamsom, Surapong. (2009). “The Effectiveness of Bilingual Education in Basic Education Curriculum Applying Sufficiency Economy Philosophy: English for Integrated Studies (EIS) Model as a Case Study” @ 4th World Teachers’ Day in Thailand and 12th UNESCO-APEID International Conference, Quality Innovations for Teaching and Learning.
