= Bilingual education =

Education conducted in two languages

In bilingual education, students are taught in two (or more) languages. It is distinct from learning a second language as a subject because both languages are used for instruction in different content areas like math, science, and history. The time spent in each language depends on the model. For example, some models focus on providing education in both languages throughout a student's entire education while others gradually transition to education in only one language. The ultimate goal of bilingual education is fluency and literacy in both languages through a variety of strategies such as translanguaging and recasting.

Research on bilingual education has increased since 2008 with translanguaging and culturally responsive pedagogies. New educational models focus on inclusivity for hard of hearing or deaf students with the integration of sign language bilingual education.

== Bilingual education program models ==
There are different ways to categorize bilingual education models, one of the most common being distinguishing their end goal.

=== Maintenance bilingual education ===
In a maintenance bilingual education program, the goal is for students to continue to learn about and in both languages for the majority of their education. Students in a maintenance bilingual education program should graduate being able to have a discussion about any content area in either language. Two common forms of maintenance bilingual education are two-way/dual language immersion and developmental (late-exit) bilingual education. Both programs are considered language immersion programs.

==== Dual language programs ====
A program that utilizes two languages, known as a dual language program, typically places students in classrooms with a mixture of native speakers for each language. One popular approach to dual language programs is the 90/10 model, where in the early grades 90% of instruction is conducted in the student's native language and 10% is taught in their second language. As the student advances, this proportion changes until an equal amount of time is spent on both languages. Another model, the 50/50 model, starts with an even distribution of instruction time between the two languages right from the start of the student's education.

==== Late exit programs ====
In a late exit or developmental program, students all have the same native language. They tend to follow the 90/10 model described above and gradually transition from a majority of instruction in their home language to a more balanced split between languages as they progress through primary school.

==== Bimodal-bilingual programs ====
In a bimodal bilingual program, students are taught in two languages in two different modalities, typically a spoken/written language and a signed language. This type of program is common at schools serving deaf and hard of hearing students.

=== Transitional bilingual education ===
In transitional (early-exit) bilingual education programs, the goal is to provide education in a child's native language to ensure that students do not fall behind in content areas such as mathematics, science, and social studies while they are learning the new language. Unlike in maintenance bilingual education programs, when the child's second language proficiency is deemed satisfactory, they transition to using only that language. This approach is based on the common underlying proficiency model of bilingualism which posits that many of the skills learned in the native language can be transferred easily to the second language later. While the linguistic goal of such programs is to help students transition to mainstream, single language classrooms, the use of the student's primary language as a vehicle to develop literacy skills and acquire academic knowledge also prevents the degeneration of a child's native language. Transitional bilingual education is the most prominent special language program in the United States with around 60% of state and locally funded programs having this title. However, according to a study of educational effectiveness by educational social scientists, transitional bilingual education programs have the same or worse effect on English Language Learner students than other types of bilingual education that are prominent in Canada.

=== English as a second language ===
English as a second language (ESL) programs are not considered bilingual education programs because they do not aim to have students become bi-literate in two (or more) languages. The goal of ESL programs is for English-language learners to learn English after having acquired one or more native languages. ESL is a supplementary, comprehensive English language learning program common in English-speaking countries and countries where English has an important role in communication as a result of colonialism or globalization. One common approach in ESL programs is sheltered English instruction (SEI). Bilingual education ESL programs are increasingly common throughout the United States, especially in states with large immigrant populations. California, for example, had 2,363,000 Dual Language Learners in 2022, making up 32% of all children aged 0–8.

== Bilingual education strategies ==
=== Translanguaging ===
Translanguaging or language mixing is a strategy that emphasizes using all languages a student knows to support their learning. One example of this is allowing students to express themselves in either or both languages when discussing different academic content. Practicing translanguaging can help students more easily switch between languages.

Since 2010, translanguaging has become popular for its inclusive approach to allow students to use both languages to fully draw from their linguistic vernacular during instruction rather than keeping both languages separated.

Recent teacher preparation standards in California have encouraged educators who are bilingual to adopt translanguaging and bilingual education into their classrooms instead of a linear and monolingual classroom.

=== Language separation ===
Language separation in a classroom refers to assigning a specific language for a particular time, content, or activity with the aim of helping students concentrate on developing their skills in that language. Bilingual programs often combine both language separation and translanguaging approaches to facilitate students in achieving bi-literacy.

=== Scaffolding ===
Instructional scaffolding can be used in all types of education, not only bilingual education. A teacher scaffolds instruction to provide the necessary support for students to learn the content. In a bilingual education classroom, this could look like pre-teaching content in the student's native language before teaching the same content in the second language.

=== Recasting ===
In bilingual education, teachers may use different techniques to correct students' language errors. One such technique is recasting, which involves repeating the student's statement with corrections for any grammatical or pronunciation mistakes, akin to how parents assist their children in learning their first language. Another technique is explicit correction, where the teacher directly points out the error in the student's statement.

== Effects of bilingual education ==
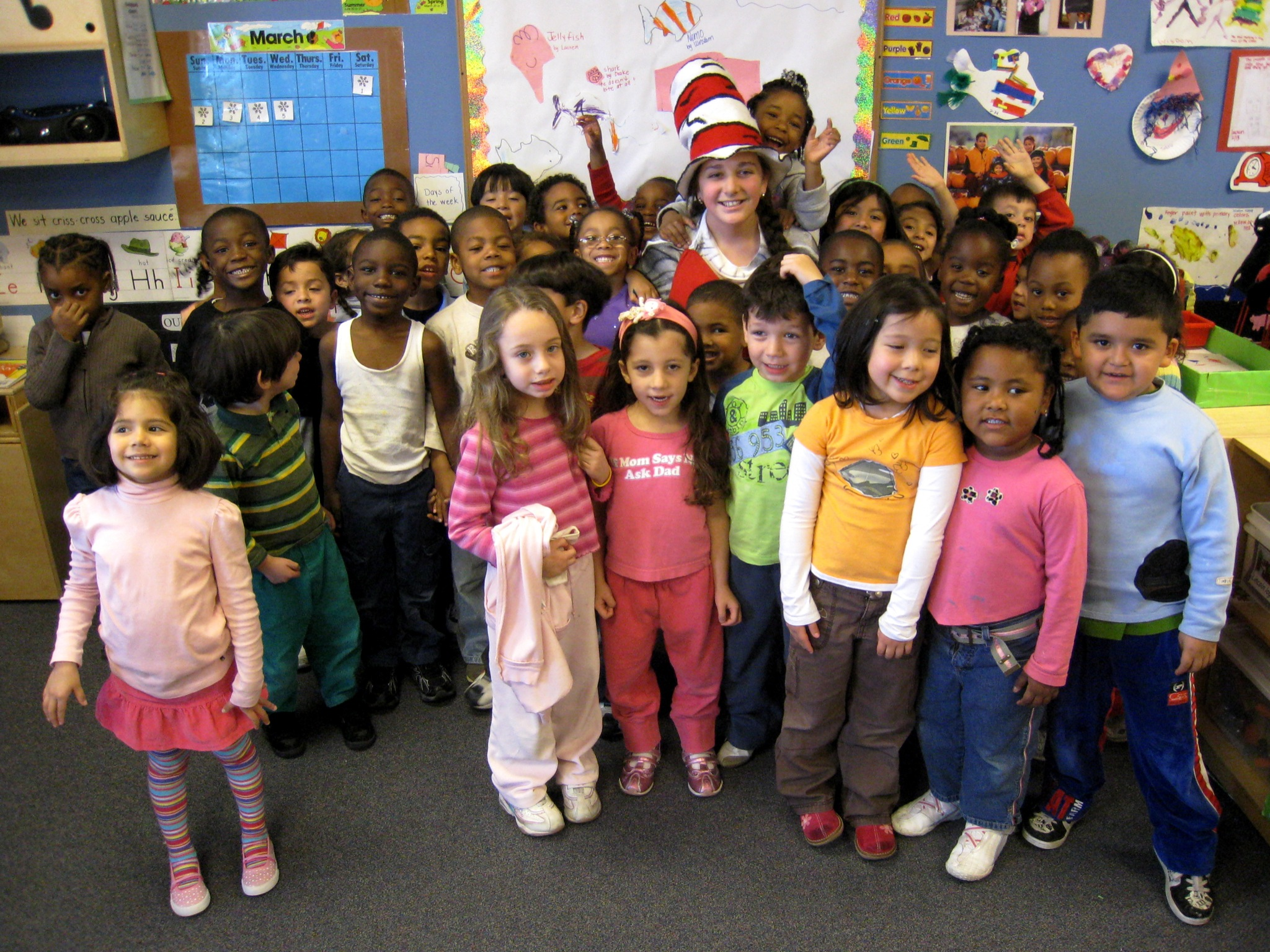
Children's Bilingual Theater Dr Seuss Day

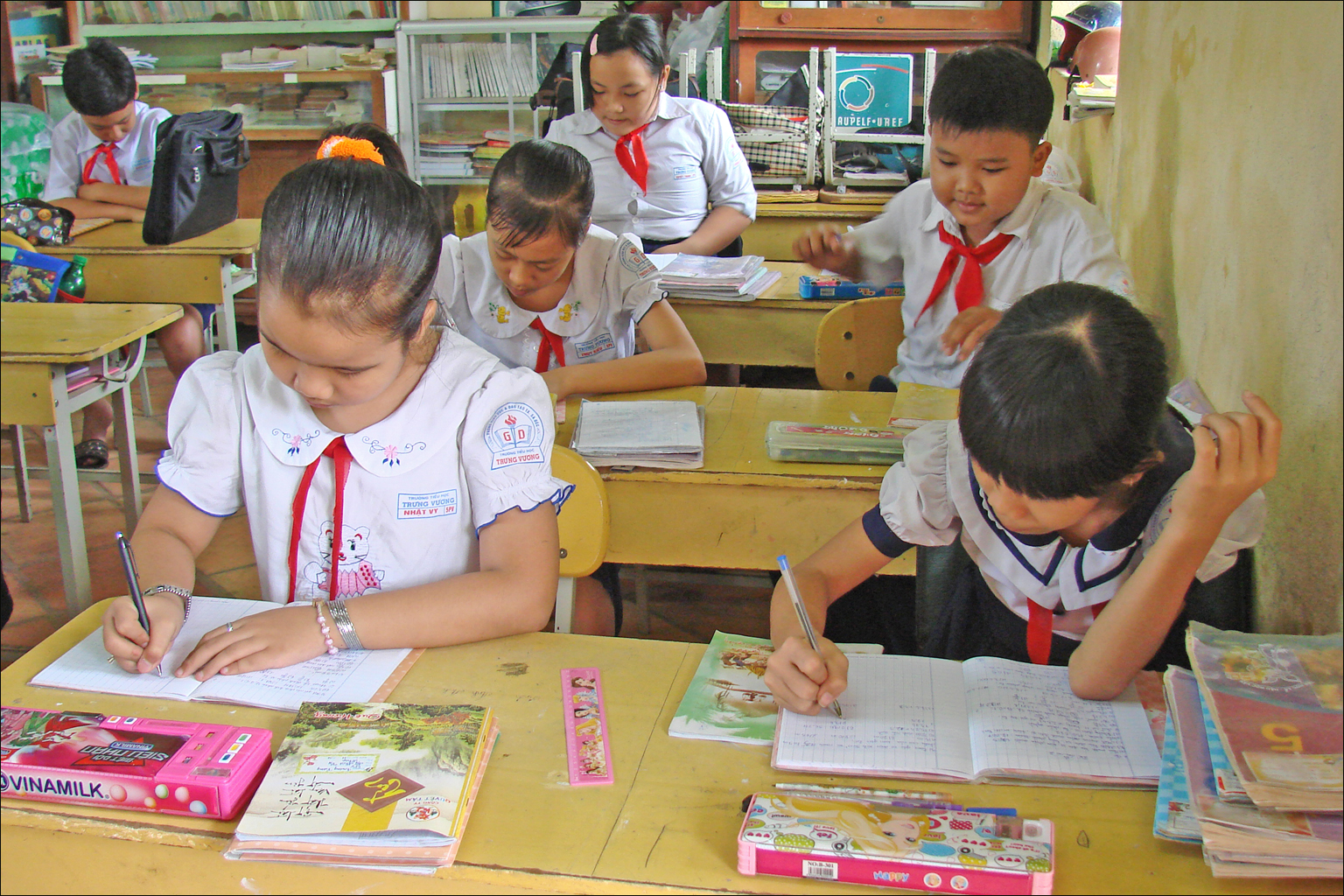
The bilingual French-speaking school Trung Vuong

This section focuses on the effects of bilingual education specifically, see Cognitive effects of bilingualism for information about the effects of bilingualism or multilingualism.

=== Benefits of bilingual education ===
The most obvious benefit of bilingual education is proficiency and literacy in two (or more languages). Fluency in multiple languages can lead to increased employment options as well as create more opportunities for intercultural communication.

Bilingual education can also support minority language speakers by communicating the value of their home or heritage language, resulting in increased self-esteem. Additionally, bilingual education models have been shown to improve student engagement and attendance as parent involvement in school activities.

Students who partake in bilingual education programs are more likely to get better grades in language arts, math, and science, while having a higher rate of graduation from high school, and feeling a boost in self-confidence. Students in bilingual programs outperform their monolingual peers and classmates.

While there has been significant research on the "bilingual brain," research specifically on how bilingual education impacts brain structure and activation is fairly limited. Though much of the research on bilinguals shows that the benefits of bilingualism are maximized when children are exposed to multiple languages at an early age, as they are in many bilingual education programs. However, some initial research has shown preschool children in bilingual education programs have similar brain activation patterns in response to known and unknown languages as adults who have been learning a second language for several years.

=== Disadvantages of bilingual education ===
In many English-speaking countries, standardized tests are in English, so there is a push to maximize the time spent learning English. Proponents of this framing advocate for Structured English Immersion in which students spend the majority of their day learning about English and in English with scaffolded supports based on their current English knowledge.

Unlike English as a second language, teachers in bilingual education programs must be fluent and literate in both languages. This requirement has contributed to a shortage of bilingual educators in many countries.

=== Parental Perceptions ===
A study done in 2025 showed that nearly 1000 parents in Texas who had children in a dual-language program found their views of the school to be safe, respectful towards students, and had great teacher communication, with the perceptions of the programs becoming more favorable the longer that the families had lived inside of the United States of America. These studies support the focus on peer support and inclusive programs. There have been an increase in deaf and hard of hearing students in sign language bilingual education, both viewed positively.

=== Bilingual programs for language revitalization ===
Bilingual education can also support language revitalization efforts in countries with endangered languages. These dormant languages are heavily intertwined with the culture, place and identity of the subsequent community, so the creation of bilingual programs to help re-awaken the endangered languages is extremely beneficial. Generally speaking, the official primary and secondary languages of a country are favored for bilingual programs, but there have been emerging bilingual programs to re-introduce an endangered language to a community. These education policies are fundamental to a communities' and next generation's identity development. An example that hindered this is that of the residential schools of Canada. Children were punished severely for speaking their mother-tongue, which has caused generational trauma among a plethora of Indigenous persons who attended these schools throughout the country. However, learning from events such as these, has helped spread awareness of language revitalization.

Bilingual programs for language revitalization are tricky; each language is different, and there is a lack of educational resources and training for teachers in that specific language. Furthermore, there is not enough research done on what the goal for bilingual programs is: is it cultural acknowledgment or bilingualism? Quite often there is a clash between the government educational policies and the actual implementation of said policies. That being said, there has been tremendous progress of working bilingual programs, one being in New Zealand. The Māori community in the Te Kōhanga Reo region created an early language childhood program that includes traditional customs of the culture. The program takes advantage of having native speakers while also recognizing that new and upcoming speakers can help the language adapt to more modern times.

Thanks to the emerging language revitalization programs, more communities can break free from an accommodation norm – feeling threatened to speak their native language due to political tensions, such as colonialism that still persists throughout most nations. The question of whose language and knowledge is more valuable should no longer linger with the help of these bilingual programs.

== See also ==
- Bilingual education by country or region
- Bimodal bilingualism
- English as a foreign or second language
- French immersion in Canada
- Intercultural bilingual education
- Literacy
- Medium of instruction
- Multilingual Education
- Secondary Level English Proficiency test
- Structured English Immersion
- Translanguaging
