= Shelf Life Extension Program =

U.S. military program

To reduce the cost to the military of maintaining stockpiles of certain pharmaceuticals, the United States Department of Defense and the Food and Drug Administration operate a joint initiative known as the Shelf-Life Extension Program (SLEP), which evaluates the long-term effectiveness of medications stockpiled by the DoD and other government agencies. The program was established in 1986.

Under the program, medications are tested for safety and stability for extended periods of time in controlled storage conditions. In many cases, medications remain effective for years after their printed expiry dates; a 2006 study published in the Journal of Pharmaceutical Sciences found that two-thirds of 122 medications tested through SLEP remained effective for an average of at least four additional years. As a cost-saving measure, the US military routinely uses a wide range of SLEP tested products past their official shelf life if drugs have been stored properly. In 2023, the DoD reported that the program had helped save the department $1.3 billion on replacing stockpiled medications.

== Participation ==
Participating agencies pay a fee to the FDA request a specific drug or medical material to be evaluated. State and local programs are not permitted to participate.

The SLEP and FDA signed a memorandum that scientific data could not be shared with the public, public health departments, other government agencies, and drug manufacturers. The failure to share data has caused foreign governments to refuse donations of expired medications.

=== Other FDA measures ===
One exception occurred during the 2010 Swine Flu Epidemic when the FDA authorized expired Tamiflu based on SLEP Data.

The US FDA is able to extend the shelf life of drugs throughout national, state, local, tribal, and territorial stockpiles through two legal means: by issuing an Emergency Use Authorization on using a drug past its expiration date (which is legally an unapproved use of a drug), or by a "expiration dating extension authority" established by the Pandemic and All-Hazards Preparedness Reauthorization Act of 2013 (PAHPRA). The PAHPRA authority only applies to so-called medical countermeasures (MCMs), which are drugs and other tools used to counter CBRN emergencies. Furthermore, FDA can choose to not take enforcement action against use of a drug past its expiration date using its enforcement discretion, but this kind of discretion is not covered by Public Readiness and Emergency Preparedness Act liability protections.

The FDA has, using these three measures, provided shelf life extensions on Covid-19 vaccines, Covid-19 antibody therapeutics, Covid-19 in vitro diagnostics, flu antivirals (Tamiflu, Relenza), doxycycline, the Jynneos Mpox vaccine (one single lot), nerve agent autoinjectors, and potassium iodide.
