= Secondary Level English Proficiency test =

The Secondary Level English Proficiency Test® was a test created by ETS and administered by American middle and high schools to applicants whose first language is not English. The SLEP® test was discontinued June 30, 2012 and replaced by the TOEFL® Junior™ test. However, a limited number of private schools continue to use the SLEP test. In addition, a large number of schools that formerly used SLEP began using the iTEP SLATE exam by Boston Educational Services after June 2012.
