= French immersion =

Form of bilingual education in Canada

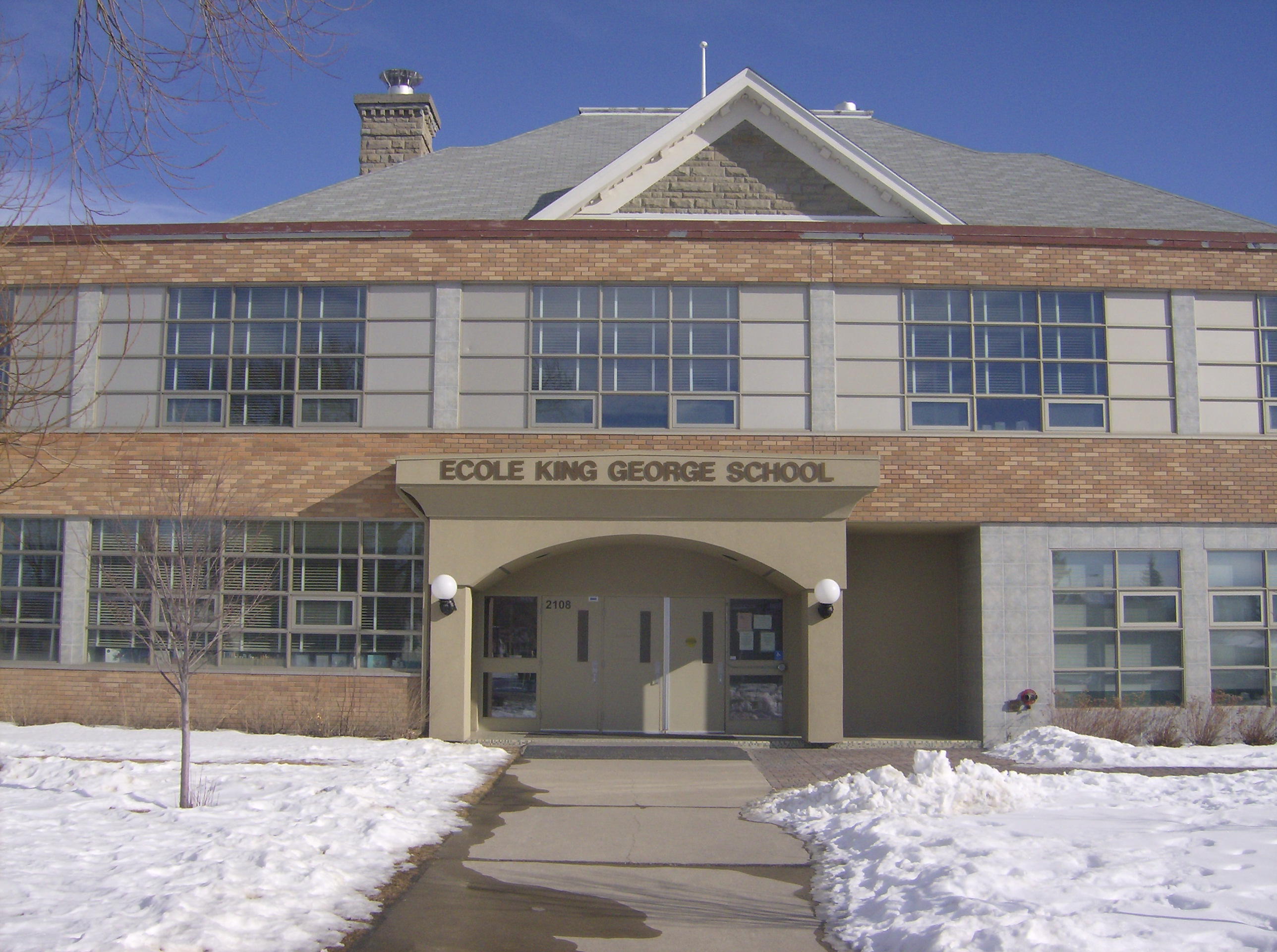
The doors of King George School in Calgary, Alberta. This started as a regular English neighbourhood school in 1912, became dual-track English-French in 1987 and single-track French immersion in 2002.

French immersion is a form of bilingual education in which students who do not speak French as a first language will receive instruction in French. In most French-immersion schools, students will learn to speak French and learn most subjects such as history, music, geography, art, physical education and science in French.

This type of education, in which most of the students are from the majority language community but are voluntarily immersed in the minority language is atypical of most language learning around the world, and was developed in Canada as a result of political and social changes in the 1960s, notably the Official Languages Act, 1969 which led many Anglophones (primarily urban or suburban and middle class) to put their children in to French programs to ensure they could succeed in the increasing number of jobs in the federal government and private sector that required personal bilingualism.

Most school boards in Canada offer French immersion starting in grade one and others start as early as kindergarten. At the primary level, students may receive instructions in French at or near a hundred percent of their instructional day, called "total immersion", or some smaller part of the day ("partial immersion"). In the case of total immersion, English instruction is introduced in grade three (Alberta) or grade four (Ontario), and the minutes of English instruction per day increase throughout their educational career with up to fifty percent of English/French instruction daily.

As of 2020, 12% of Canadian students (excluding in Quebec) were enrolled in a French immersion program, compared to 34% who took conventional French classes in an otherwise-English school environment. As of 2021, 483,000 students were enrolled in French immersion programs only in public elementary and secondary schools in Canada outside Quebec and Nunavut.

== Background ==
=== Canadian context ===
In many countries around the world, students are educated in two or more languages: often all students learn at least one foreign language, perhaps the language of a former colonizer (e.g. French in West Africa, English in South Asia, etc.); commonly minorities learn the majority language, often this is required by law or is simply thought of as an economic necessity; and occasionally two or more language communities in the same country learn each other's languages. The Canadian model differs from most countries in that it is a wealthy and politically influential sub-set of the majority language community that has voluntarily decided to demand that local governments offer their children an intensive immersion in the language of a minority. This would have been unthinkable before the constitutional and societal consequences of the Quiet Revolution (circa 1960s) in Quebec, and the passage of the Official Languages Act, 1969 by the federal parliament and the Official Language Act (Bill 22) in Quebec in 1974, which together mandated that tens of thousands of jobs in government and industry including high-paying professional and managerial work now required French.

The idea of using immersion as a language-learning tool is not a new one globally. However, it needed influential English-Canadian champions who were able to convince others both that French was worth learning and that immersion was the correct method before it spread in Canada.

The University of Western Ontario began offering a language home-stay program for young adults in Trois-Pistoles 1933, for example, because of the advocacy of Western's president, Dr. William Sherwood Fox, who had learned French by traveling in Quebec in 1900.

The "founding mothers" of elementary school French immersion in Canada are generally cited as Olga Melikoff, Valerie Neale, and Murielle Parkes from Saint-Lambert, Quebec, three English-speaking housewives who wanted to see their children learn French to a higher standard than was usually achieved in the English schools in Quebec at the time. Unable to convince the school authorities, they hired a teacher and ran their own kindergarten on the principals of early immersion. The promising results of the experiment in Saint-Lambert were studied and endorsed by researchers at McGill University, Wallace E. Lambert and Wilder Penfield. After this endorsement, the school board adopted the program and it was quickly copied by other boards across Canada. As the number of French immersion schools grew, larger academic studies showed the students had very good, though not native-level French, and had no major delay in English.

The founding of the advocacy group Canadian Parents for French in 1977 represented the mainstreaming of the program across Canada.

=== Design of the earliest school programs ===
French immersion in the Canadian context differs markedly from other language programs aimed at teaching minorities the language of the majority (sometimes called "submersion" instead of immersion by critics). Researcher Marjorie Bingham Wesche offers the following contextual characteristics of the original Canadian model:

1. Learners were majority language speakers, and there was no sense of "threat" against the status of English in their home communities.
2. Learners were all in the "same boat" all learning French as true beginners, so teachers adjusted to their level (i.e. used Comprehensible Input)
3. The program was optional, and learners were thus "volunteers" whose parents enthusiastically encouraged their learning.
4. Both languages were valued by parents, the immediate community, and the larger society.
5. The two languages were related, and have many cognates and loanwords.
6. School funding and decision making was under local political control, so the parents could pressure the board to take up their ideas.
7. Native speaker teachers of the immersion language were widely available and were willing to teach to children from the other language community.
8. Source material was easily accessible. French-medium textbooks and other materials were already available in Canada in a way that would have been very different for any other target language.

Besides these contextual factors, the program's design also had a few key features:

1. The earliest possible school starting age (Kindergarten or Grade 1, aged four to six years).
2. Intensive L2 exposure over an extended period.
3. Use of the L2 to teach the entire school curriculum.

Many variations have emerged since the earlier programs were designed; however, the original model (now called "early immersion") has produced good results and is still one of the most popular in Canada.

=== Typical features ===
French immersion education remains optional and not compulsory; parents have the choice of sending their children to schools that offer such programs. Students are encouraged to begin communicating in French as consistently as possible. Teachers in French immersion schools are competent in speaking French, either having acquired specific French as-a-second-language qualifications or already being fluent in French and having a teaching certification. Classroom communication of French in French immersion programs is meaningful and authentic for students. Learning French becomes subconscious and there is a strong focus on understanding before speaking. Most students that enroll in French immersion programs are not experts in French and lack experience in it. Students in French immersion programs complete the same core curriculum subjects as students in the English-language program.

The French immersion concept was designed to: (a) capitalize on children's ability to learn language naturally and effortlessly; (b) take advantage of their social ability and open attitudes to language and culture; (c) reflect on the building blocks of language by emphasizing the use of languages for communication and (d) not stopping the children from participating in native language development, academic achievement or general cognitive development.

=== Formats ===
==== Programs ====
- French Immersion: French as the language of instruction
- Extended French: available only in Ontario, Newfoundland and Labrador, and Nova Scotia; French as the language of instruction for one or two core subjects in addition to French Language Arts
- Intensive French: a more recent program which started in 1998 in Newfoundland and Labrador and branched out to six other provinces and the Northwest Territories; intensive period of French instruction for one-half of the school year (70% of school day in French)

==== Age ====
The age an individual begins the French immersion program varies:

- Early Immersion: Kindergarten or Grade One
- Middle Immersion: Grade Four or Five
- Late Immersion: Grade Six, Seven, or Eight

==== Time ====
The amount of time French immersion students spend in immersion varies:

- Total: commences with 100% immersion in the second language and continually decreases to 50%
- Partial: commences with close to 50% immersion and remains at this level

== Benefits ==
A study shows that French immersion might improve academic performance.

Students participate in French immersion programs to gain employability-related skills and to increase job opportunities.

Students in French immersion demonstrate a superior level of mental flexibility, which is an ability to think more independently of words and to have a higher awareness of concept formation as well as a more diversified intelligence than students in the regular program.

Data illustrates that students in French immersion programs also have a linguistic advantage as they are able to adopt two different perspectives, offering alternative ways to look at the same information.

Students in French immersion programs also have greater opportunity to understand their own culture or their own nation. For example, Canada's identity is based on the fact that it holds two official languages, English and French. French immersion students have the opportunity to gain a greater understanding of what it means to be Canadian through the French immersion program.

== Challenges ==
Many challenges in participating in French immersion programs persist. For example, many French immersion students do not reach native-like language proficiency in French. This could be due, in part, to the fact that there is a lack of willingness on the part of French immersion students to communicate in French outside of the classroom. This lack of willingness may stem from students not feeling prepared or equipped to practice the language.

Access to special education resources is often restricted to students in French immersion and as such, it is often suggested to parents that they switch their children to a regular English stream in order to access the support that their child requires. Nevertheless, such students still benefit from the French immersion program and resources aren't completely absent. French immersion teachers could go through professional development training and courses about special education integration for their programs, while, with parental involvement, create referral processes for special education in French immersion. However, where special education resources are insufficient, student outcomes may be less favourable.

French immersion students from elementary schools often experience difficulties when entering a high school which provides the full curriculum in English only. This often leads to problems with "both language and subject matter gaps in their learning", according to a Toronto Star report. Students who do have access to a high school with French instruction may feel overwhelmed with having to learn heavy content in mathematics and science in their second language. Teachers in such schools can be equally overwhelmed with being restricted to using only French in these contexts, and may experience guilt when English is used in their classrooms to reinforce vocabulary and complex concepts. Some experts recommend debate within school boards and ministries about allowing the use of English in French immersion contexts when teaching complex concepts in mathematics and science.

It is extremely difficult for school boards in Canada to hire teachers who are fully fluent in French and also have experience and evidence of excellent teaching skills in the various subjects that they must teach in elementary schools, for example. As early as 1982, school boards in Winnipeg had to cap enrolment in French immersion due to high demand. A school board in the Greater Toronto Area reported in 2017 that 80% of principals recently reported finding it extremely difficult to hire French-speaking teachers of the same calibre as the English-speaking staff. In fact, in November 2017, the Halton Catholic District School Board was considering an end to their French immersion program for this reason. Some experts have suggested that research be conducted to seek strategies for French teacher recruitment to alleviate staff shortages in Canadian schools. Scholarship and bursary programs for prospective Bachelor of Education students to gain French teaching qualifications are also suggested to alleviate these shortages. The province of Ontario planned to open its first university where classes will be taught exclusively in French and this may alleviate the staffing problems eventually. By late 2017, the final recommendations from a planning board had been submitted to the government. The Université de l'Ontario français began accepting students in 2021.

A report, by a PhD candidate scholar in educational policy at the University of Toronto, also discussed concerns about French immersion creating a dual track academic stream in many schools. She referred to a system "where the smart, motivated kids are funnelled into French, and everyone else gets left behind in English" which can become viewed as the "de facto low track stream". The author discussed a study at a Vancouver school, published in the British Journal of Sociology of Education, which concluded that "French immersion programmes operate as a 'cream-skimming' phenomenon ... [that] allows white, middle-class parents to access markers of higher social status and prestige." Similarly, a 2019 report from the Toronto District School Board found that French immersion programs had a higher percentage of students who have parents with a very high socio-economic status, raising fears of a two-tier school system.

A report by the Canadian Council on Learning spoke on the failure of many students to learn French: "Although most Canadian school children are taught English or French as a second language in school, these lessons often fail to yield functional bilingualism. For example, New Brunswick's French Second Language Commission recently reported that fewer than 1% of the students who enrolled in "core French" in 1994 had met the provincial minimum goal by 2007. And fewer than 10% of students who enrolled in early-French immersion in 1995 had attained the provincial goal by 2007."

== Use of French immersion programs ==
French immersion programs were introduced into Canadian schools in the 1960s to encourage bilingualism across the country. Now immersion programs provide an alternative education stream for many students. Since their implementation, French immersion programs have become increasingly popular across Canada and school districts have seen significant increased enrolment in their French immersion student population over the years.

=== K–12 education ===
French immersion programs are offered in most Anglophone public school districts. French immersion is also done in some private schools and preschools.

=== Higher education ===
Generally, colleges and universities in Canada teach in only one of the two official languages. Students must pass linguistic entrance exams to study in a language they did not complete their schooling in. All universities and many colleges will offer traditional language learning in the other official language; however, these are not immersion in the sense used in schools. A few institutions have both French and English faculties in the same university, but admission to individual courses still requires preexisting language skills. The University of Ottawa briefly offered specialized science classes for students studying in their second language during the 1980s, but these were phased out in favour of traditional language courses.

True immersion occurs at summer programs that are part of the Explore program funded by the federal government, based on the Trois-Pistoles program at Western founded in 1933 (see above).

=== Regional discrepancies ===
French-immersion programs were offered in all ten Canadian provinces until 2022 when New Brunswick announced plans to abolish the program. The popularity of French immersion and "core French" differ by province and region. Note that these numbers refers to anglophone and allophone pupils: it does not include francophone mother-tongue students, who are enrolled in a separate school system altogether. Historically, enrolment in French immersion was proportionally highest in Quebec and New Brunswick, both provinces that have their own provincial language laws, above and beyond the federal Official Languages Act, which made knowledge of French even more valuable in the local job markets. French immersion enrolment is lowest in Western Canada and the North, where job requiring French are more rare. However all regions except New Brunswick (where the rules on eligibility were changed) experienced growth in proportionate and absolute terms between 2000 and 2012.

Students enrolled in French immersion in Canada
| Province/Territory | 2019–2020 | 2018–2019 | 2012 | 2000 |
|---|---|---|---|---|
| Alberta | 7% | 7% | 7% | 4% |
| British Columbia | 9% | 9% | 9% | 2% |
| Manitoba | 15% | 14% | 12% | 6% |
| New Brunswick | 36% | 37% | 25% | 32% |
| Newfoundland and Labrador | 17% | 16% | 14% | 7% |
| Nova Scotia | 14% | 14% | 13% | 12% |
| Northwest Territories | 13% | 13% | —N/a | —N/a |
| Nunavut | 0% | 0% | —N/a | —N/a |
| Ontario | 13% | 13% | 9% | 6% |
| Prince Edward Island | 27% | 27% | 23% | 20% |
| Québec | —N/a | —N/a | 37% | 22% |
| Saskatchewan | 9% | 8% | 7% | 3% |
| Yukon | 16% | 15% | —N/a | —N/a |
| Canada (excl. Quebec) | 12% | 12% | —N/a | —N/a |

=== Core French ===
Students enrolled in core French in Canada
| Province/Territory | 2019–2020 | 2018–2019 | 2012 |
|---|---|---|---|
| Alberta | 22% | 22% | 32% |
| British Columbia | 32% | 32% | 32% |
| Manitoba | 30% | 31% | 35% |
| New Brunswick | 51% | 51% | 60% |
| Newfoundland and Labrador | 44% | 45% | 45% |
| Nova Scotia | 38% | 39% | 40% |
| Northwest Territories | 17% | 20% | 22% |
| Nunavut | 2% | 2% | 1% |
| Ontario | 40% | 40% | 41% |
| Prince Edward Island | 34% | 34% | 34% |
| Québec | —N/a | —N/a | 64% |
| Saskatchewan | 18% | 18% | 22% |
| Yukon | 31% | 33% | —N/a |
| Canada (excl. Quebec) | 34% | 34% | —N/a |

== Controversy ==
Often, because French immersion is a "program of choice" and not a required part of the curriculum, school boards charge parents busing fees to have their children attend a school other than the one in their own neighbourhood. This is a financial barrier of a kind that is usually not accepted in Canada's culture of universal, public education.

Since French immersion was designed for anglophone children learning French as a second language, it did not meet the needs of francophone children living in minority communities outside of Quebec. This problem was addressed by the creation of separate francophone school systems in the 1990s.

In 2008, an editorial in the Vancouver Sun criticized French immersion programs for having become a way for higher socioeconomic groups to obtain a publicly funded elite track education. Since lower socioeconomic groups and children with learning and behavioural problems have lower rates of participation in French immersion, a situation has developed in which ambitious families might prefer French immersion more for its effective streaming than for the bilingual skills it gives to students.

Enrolment in French immersion programs has become difficult for immigrants to Canada, because it is argued by school administrators and board professionals that learning English as a second language presents enough of a challenge for students. The lack of accessibility to French immersion programs for English language learners is very similar to that for students with special needs.

As a result, the media places blame on Canada's immigrants for the declining number of Canadians who are able to speak English and French, while the immigrant community continues to pursue opportunities to become fluent in both official languages of Canada. It is suggested that Canada's education system provide more opportunities to immigrants to become proficient in English and French in order to increase the number of Canadians who have knowledge of both official languages.

=== Attempted abolition in New Brunswick ===
Critics argued that success of French immersion programs gave an unfair advantage to those students over other Anglophone students who only took "core French" (non-immersion, traditional language courses). This led to several attempts at reforms. In 2008, the government announced that the earliest possible starting year for full immersion would be raised to grade 6, but in the face of protests and court challenges later moved this to grade 3. Then in 2017 immersion starting in grade 1 was brought back.

New Brunswick is the only province with constitutionally-enshrined official bilingualism based on a model of perfect equality between the languages. Every ten years, the government of New Brunswick commissions a report on the status of bilingualism in that province. The 2022 report written by provincial court Judge Yvette Finn and former deputy education minister John McLaughlin found that while 90% of French of immersion students were conversant in French, less than 10% of students in the regular English stream were. This was considered a major problem by Premier Blaine Higgs as he has stated personal bilingualism for all New Brunswickers should be the goal of the education system. The report summarized its recommendations on the topic thusly:

Our consultation and research have led us to one overwhelming conclusion: New Brunswick needs one strong, authentic, and engaging French second-language program of studies for all students in the Anglophone sector.

As a result, Premier Higgs announced that while existing student in French immersion would be able to continue, new intakes of French immersion would cease in 2023 to be replaced by a yet-to-be-designed French curriculum for all non-Francophone students. Subsequently, the education minister resigned and the teachers' union protested that the timeline was much too quick for such a radical change.

In the face of intense backlash from parents, the Higgs government announced on February 17, 2023, that it would no longer proceed with the plan.

== Outside Canada ==
The Agence pour l'enseignement français à l'étranger (AEFE) runs or funds 470 schools worldwide, with French as the primary language of instruction in most schools.

=== Australia ===
French immersion is used in Australian schools such as Benowa State High School and The Southport School; teaching mathematics, SOSE, science and French, entirely in French.

There is also a French immersion program offered at Methodist Ladies' College and Mansfield State High School teaching a variety of subjects over three years in French.

Telopea Park School in Canberra is a bilingual French–English school.

The program is also offered at The Glennie School in Toowoomba, Queensland.

Lycée Condorcet in Maroubra, Sydney, teaches almost entirely in French and conforms to the French government system, enabling students to easily transition to and from France to the school.

=== United Kingdom ===
Walker Road Primary School, Aberdeen, Scotland, started an early partial immersion program in 2000. Also, Judgemeadow Community College, Evington, in Leicester, has been using a French immersion course in one form group a year for the last four years. Pupils answer the register in French, and their French, IT and PHSE lessons are all in French. The Lycée Français Charles de Gaulle (originally Lycée Français de Londres) is a French school transported to England and as such the vast majority of the teaching is in French and caters to French curricula and indeed, as far as quatrième (at the age of 13–14), all pupils are taught entirely in French.

=== United States ===
Private French language immersion schools in the United States have existed since at least the 1950s. Most of these schools receive help from the AEFE. There are currently almost 40 of these schools in the United States.

Public school districts have run French immersion programs since 1974.

- Montgomery County, Maryland (since 1974)
- Milwaukee French Immersion School (since 1978)
- Holliston, Massachusetts (since 1979)
- Louisiana (since 1984) – 26 immersion programs in 9 parishes, supported by CODOFIL, a department of Louisiana's government that preserves Louisiana French culture within the state.
- Prince George's County, Maryland (since 1984)
- Eugene, Oregon (since 1984)
- Portland, Oregon (since 1979)
- Lake Charles, Louisiana (since 1985)
- Miami (since 1986)
- Kansas City, Missouri
- Milton, Massachusetts (since 1987)
- Columbus, Ohio (since 1987)
- Edina, Minnesota (since 1991)
- San Diego, California (since 1994)
- Madawaska, Maine (since 1995)
- St. Paul, Minnesota (since 1996)
- New York (since 2007)
- Fairfax County, Virginia
- Henrico County, Virginia – High school French immersion program
- Santa Rosa, California (since 2012)
- Frank D. Parent Elementary School – French immersion program, West LA, Inglewood, California (since 2017)

The southern part of Louisiana has a strong French heritage extending back to colonial times. During the mid-twentieth century, however, the number of native French speakers plunged as French was banned in public schools and children were punished for speaking it. The social stigma associated with speaking French was strong enough that many parents did not teach the language to their children, so generations born in the second half of the century rarely spoke French in the home. As a result, French immersion is today viewed by parents and educators as a way to save the French language in Louisiana, where there are more French immersion programs than in any other state.

== See also ==
- Language immersion
- Structured English Immersion
