= 1998 California Proposition 227 =

Referendum on bilingual education

Proposition 227
- English Language in Public Schools. Initiative Statute.

Results
Choice	Votes	%
Yes	3,599,312	60.88%
No	2,313,058	39.12%
Valid votes	5,912,370	95.26%
Invalid or blank votes	294,248	4.74%
Total votes	6,206,618	100.00%
- County results Yes: 50–60% 60–70% 70–80% No: 50–60% 60–70%

Proposition 227 was a California ballot proposition passed on the June 2, 1998, ballot. Proposition 227 was repealed by Proposition 58 on November 8, 2016.

According to Ballotpedia, "Proposition 227 changed the way that "Limited English Proficient" (LEP) students are taught in California. Specifically, it

- Required California public schools to teach LEP students in special classes that are taught nearly all in English. This provision eliminated "bilingual" classes in most cases.
- Shortened the time that most LEP students stayed in special classes.
- Eliminated most programs in the state that provided multi-year special classes to LEP students by requiring that (1) LEP students move from special classes to regular classes when they had acquired a good working knowledge of English and (2) these special classes not normally last longer than one year.
- Required the state government to provide $50 million every year for ten years for English classes for adults who promised to tutor LEP students.

The bill's intention was to educate Limited English proficiency students in a rapid, one-year program. It was sponsored by Ron Unz, the runner-up candidate in the 1994 Republican gubernatorial primary. The proposition was controversial because of its close proximity to heated political issues including race, immigration, and poverty. The methods of education enacted by the proposition reflected the electorate's support of assimilation over multiculturalism. It passed with a margin of 61% to 39%.

On September 28, 2014, the state legislature passed, and Governor Jerry Brown signed, Senate Bill 1174, which added Proposition 58 to the November 2016 ballot. Proposition 58, which repealed most of Proposition 227, passed by a margin of 74% to 26%.

The number of bilingual credentials fell after Proposition 227's passage. A California Department of Education spokesperson anticipated a shortage of bilingual teachers after the passage of Proposition 58.

== See also ==
- Bilingual Education
- Bilingual Education Act
- English for Children (Arizona Proposition 203, 2000)
