= 2000 Arizona Proposition 203 =

Referendum on English-language instruction

Proposition 203
- November 7, 2000
- English Language Education for Children in Public Schools

Results
Choice	Votes	%
Yes	925,415	63.02%
No	542,942	36.98%
Total votes	1,468,357	100.00%
County results
For
70–80%
60–70%
50–60%
Against
70–80%
50–60%

Arizona Proposition 203, also known as English for the Children, is a ballot initiative that was passed by 63% of Arizona voters on November 7, 2000. It limited the type of instruction available to English language learner (ELL) students. Before Proposition 203, schools were free in terms of ELL instruction to use bilingual or immersion methods. According to a cover letter from the Arizona Department of Education Superintendent of Public Instruction Lisa Graham Keegan to the Arizona Legislature, it was impossible to make a correct analysis regarding how many students were learning through English as a second language programs, as opposed to bilingual education. The school districts had submitted "conflicting information," and 40% had not submitted any data, in spite of three deadline extensions.

Proposition 203, like the similar California Proposition 227, was named after its financial supporter Ron Unz, a Silicon Valley software entrepreneur. 61% of the voters had passed Proposition 227. Arizona, Massachusetts, and Colorado followed with similar campaigns directed by Unz. On November 5, 2002, Question 2 in Massachusetts was passed by 68% of the voters, but Amendment 31 in Colorado was rejected by 56% of the voters. Unz's goal was to replace bilingual education with structured or sheltered English immersion programs. The book English for the Children: Mandated by the People, Skewed by Politicians and Special Interests by Johanna J. Haver (Rowman & Littlefield Education, 2013) reconstructs the politics surrounding Unz's movement and its effects on the education of ELLs.

== Content ==
The actual text of the legislation begins with declarations regarding the importance of English and learning English. It goes on to state that immigrant parents want their children to acquire "a good knowledge of English," allowing them to "fully participate in the American dream." It explains that the government and Arizona public schools have a moral responsibility to "provide all of Arizona's children... with the skills necessary to become productive members of our society." It elaborates that public schools "currently do an inadequate job of educating immigrant children" by "experimental language programs whose failure over the past two decades is demonstrated by the current high drop-out rates and low English literacy levels of many immigrant children." It makes the point that "young immigrant children can easily acquire full fluency in a new language, such as English, if they are heavily exposed to that language in the classroom at an early age."

The resolution states that "all children in Arizona public schools shall be taught English as rapidly and effectively as possible." ELLs should be educated in immersion programs during a temporary transition period "not normally intended to exceed one year." A parent may request for his or her child to be exempt if it can be determined that the child already knows English, the child is ten years old or older, or the child is identified as having special needs. However, for a child to claim to have special needs, it must be confirmed that education in English is not the best option for the child.

== Media coverage ==
The New York Times ran a front-page story in August prior to the November 2000 election, showing that California's version of the initiative, Proposition 227, had been highly successful, with a rise in standardized test scores among English language learners after two years. In spite of noted bilingual education theorists' arguments, disputing the particulars of the article, the Times story is believed to have strongly affected public opinion and the passage of Arizona Proposition 203.

== Implementation ==
Implementation of the policy was scheduled to occur at the beginning of the 2001–2002 school year. There was widespread confusion throughout the state because of differences of opinion regarding the language used in the text of the proposition. Following the implementation, some schools changed their approach to educating ELLs, but several districts obtained waivers for their ELL students and continued their bilingual education programs. For the most part, neither the bilingual nor the immersion programs were in compliance with the law. Fewer than 11% of the state's ELL students achieved proficiency in a year's time.

== See also ==
- 1998 California Proposition 227
