= 2016 California Proposition 58 =

Proposition 58
- English Proficiency. Multilingual Education. Initiative Statute.

Results
| Choice | Votes | % |
|---|---|---|
| Yes | 9,994,454 | 73.52% |
| No | 3,598,855 | 26.48% |
| Valid votes | 13,593,309 | 93.04% |
| Invalid or blank votes | 1,017,200 | 6.96% |
| Total votes | 14,610,509 | 100.00% |
| Registered voters/turnout | 19,411,771 | 75.27% |
- County results Yes 80%–90% 70%–80% 60%–70% 50%–60%

Proposition 58 is a California ballot proposition that passed on the November 8, 2016 ballot. Proposition 58 repealed bilingual education restrictions enacted by Proposition 227 in 1998.

Proposition 58 passed by a wide margin.

It preserves the requirement that public schools ensure students obtain an English language proficiency, require school districts to solicit parent/community input in developing language acquisition programs, require instruction to ensure English acquisition as rapidly and effectively as possible, and authorize school districts to establish dual–language immersion programs for both native and non–native English speakers.

After the passage of Proposition 227 in 1998, students were required to be taught in an English-only environment, where the student was taught English by a teacher who only speaks English. Proposition 227 also required limited English proficient students who were in separate classes to be put into regular classes, ended bilingual programs, and required students to be taught in an English-only environment.

Under Proposition 58, the public school systems will have the right to choose the way they see as appropriate for their students to learn English more swiftly. Students will now have the option to be taught in an English-only environment, or a bilingual environment, where a person of the student's native language teaches them English. This also allows English speaking students to learn in another language.

A California Department of Education spokesperson anticipated a shortage of bilingual teachers under Proposition 58. The number of bilingual credentials had fallen after Proposition 227's passage.
