= Elementary and Secondary Education Act, Title III Part A =

The English Language Acquisition, Language Enhancement, and Academic Achievement Act - formerly known as the Bilingual Education Act - is a federal grant program described in Title III Part A of the federal Elementary and Secondary Education Act (ESEA), which was reauthorized as the No Child Left Behind Act in 2002 and again as the Every Student Succeeds Act in 2015. This section is specifically targeted to benefit Limited English Proficient (LEP) children and immigrant youth. The statute states that LEP students must not only attain English proficiency but simultaneously meet the same academic standards as their English-speaking peers in all content areas. Federal funding is provided to assist State Education Agencies (SEAs) and Local Education Agencies (LEAs) in meeting these requirements. In 2011, ESEA Title III awards were granted to 56 SEAs (including states, districts, and territories) and the average award given to an individual SEA was $12,158,046.

== Overview ==
SEAs and LEAs are expected to use ESEA Title III funding to create or further develop language instruction courses that help LEP students meet academic standards. The LEAs and SEAs who receive ESEA Title III funding are responsible for the yearly progress of their students with respect to development of language proficiency as well as meeting their grade-level academic standards. LEP students are measured against annual development objectives in order to receive funding. SEAs and LEAs are held accountable for the progress of LEP and immigrant students through annual measurable achievement outcomes (AMAOs): the number of LEP students making sufficient progress in English acquisition, attaining English proficiency, and meeting Adequate Yearly Progress (AYP) Funding is typically used towards language instruction programs; however, funding may be used for a variety of purposes, including alternative bilingual education programs and professional development for teachers. Funding is also allocated for teaching English to the parents and communities of LEP children.

The amount of funding each state receives is determined by formula derived from the number of LEP and immigrant students in that state. The number of LEP students in each state is determined using information provided by the US census as well as yearly state-issued surveys. The grant is divided into subgrants made available to LEAs within the state. In order for an LEA within a given state to receive ESEA Title III funding, it must reapply each school year, providing data with respect to the size and progress of the LEP population.

While the main purpose of ESEA Title III regulations and funding are to ensure language proficiency and on grade-level academic performance of LEP students, there are also regulations regarding parent communication. Any LEA that receives ESEA Title III funding is obligated to inform families and communities of LEP and immigrant children about their ESL programming and how they can assist in their child’s progress. In addition, all schools (whether or not they receive federal funding) are required to provide appropriate communication with all parents and guardians regardless of their native language and the percentage of non-English parents are a part of the school community.

ESEA Title III funds are available to public schools, including charter schools. Private schools are not eligible for these federal funds; however, LEP students who attend private school may still enroll in federally funded English classes at their local public school.

== Historical context ==
The discussion of equal educational opportunity for LEP students was first made public in the late 1960s with many other civil rights issues. In 1970, the federal Office for Civil Rights issued a memorandum which stated that school districts must take affirmative action to ensure that the native language of minority students did not inhibit their participation in the educational system. In 1974, the Supreme Court’s decision in Lau v. Nichols affirmed the notion. In their decision, the court argued that providing the same resources to LEP students as their English-speaking peers was denying them of obtaining an appropriate education. In direct response to the Lau v. Nichols decision, congress passed the Equal Educational Opportunity Act, which not only mandated equal rights for LEP students, but also stated that a failure to provide adequate resources for overcoming language differences was considered a denial of equal education.

The issue of educational equity resurfaced in the mid-1990s, when many cities and states across the nation experienced a large influx of immigrants. Between 1995 and 2005, the number of immigrant children in grades K-12 rose more than 57%. Since this time, the demographics of the United States have been changing radically, particularly with respect to Hispanic individuals. In 1980, there were 14.6 million Hispanics in the United States, which accounted for about 6% of the population. By 2000, the population had grown to 35.3 million, or 12.5% of the population. It is now estimated that the Hispanic population will exceed one-third of the national population by 2050.

The United States also experienced exponential growth of the LEP student population beginning in the mid-1990s. Between 1998 and 2008, LEP students rose from 2.03% to 53.25% of the total number of students enrolled in public schools. In the 2008–2009 school year, there were 5,346,673 identified LEP students, which is over 10% of total enrollment in public schools in the United States. The states with the highest LEP populations in 2008–2009 were: California, Texas, Florida, New York, and Illinois. Despite the influx of immigrants into the country, the majority of LEP students in the United States are native born.

The two opposing schools of thought with regards to educational equity in the second half of the 20th century were differentiation and universalism. The legislation that arose from the Civil Rights Movement and cases such as Lau v. Nichols argued that in order to create equal educational opportunity, students should be treated differently based on their individual needs. As a result, differentiated instruction shaped educational policy in that era. However, in the late 20th and early 21st centuries, criticism began to surface, claiming that differentiated instruction was failing because it was furthering cultural and linguistic differences between subgroups of students. After the publication of A Nation at Risk in 1983, educational policy began to shift towards standards-based reform.

Standards-based education reform is designed to promote equity through universalism, unifying education nationwide through high academic standards that must be met by all students. As this paradigm shift began to work its way into national policies such as Goals 2000 and the 1994 re-authorization of the Elementary and Secondary Education Act (ESEA), the focus became more on lofty and rigorous educational outcomes rather than vocational or alternative education methods (such as bilingual education) that had been popular in previous decades. Just as federal policies began to reflect these pedagogical changes, states also began to implement changes to reflect the same values. In 1998, California passed an initiative that almost all classroom instruction should be in English. These changes were due mainly in response to federal English-only standardized testing. The effects of such a drastic policy change were felt statewide due to the high LEP population. The increased focus on curriculum, instruction, and standardized assessments also shaped the changes in policy reflected in the No Child Left Behind Act of 2001.

== Changes in policy ==
The English Language Acquisition, Language Enhancement, and Academic Achievement Act is a part of the No Child Left Behind Act of 2001 and acted as a replacement for the Bilingual Education Act of 1968, which expired in 2002 The focus of NCLB was for eligible academic institutions to become self-sufficient and expand their capacity to serve low-income students by providing funds to improve and strengthen the academic quality, institutional management, and fiscal stability of eligible institutions.

The Bilingual Education Act of 1968, which was Title VII of the Elementary and Secondary Education Act, presented the challenges of non-English speaking students and promoted bilingual education as an appropriate and effective way to serve LEP students. Its main purpose was to promote the development of innovative ESL education by offering competitive grants for SEAs. It was written at the height of the civil rights movement and reflected the nation’s changing attitudes towards diversity and equality.

The BEA went through many revisions throughout its lifespan. The first set of clarifications was added in 1974, as a response to Lau v. Nichols and the Equal Educational Opportunity Act. The changes to the BEA throughout the latter half of the 20th century mainly involved: expanding and restructuring the grant program, increasing professional development, and expanding the definitions of bilingual programming and LEP. These changes were shaped mainly by studies of bilingual education in Canada, as little research was conducted on the effects of bilingual education in the United States. In 2001, ESEA was reauthorized as NCLB, and the BEA was replaced by Title III Part A.

English as a Second Language education pedagogy comprises two main ideologies: bilingual education or English-only education. The U.S. Department of Education’s Office for Civil Rights has set general guidelines that states must follow, but does not specify a preference of methodology. Since federal regulation does not specify the type of programming a SEA or LEA must adapt, approaches to ESL change with larger trends in educational policy. When the Bilingual Education Act was adopted in 1968, it emphasized alternative language acquisition methodology and bilingual education as the primary method to serve LEP students. However, through Title III Part A of NCLB in 2001, the focus shifted towards standards-based assessments; as a result, so did the policy regarding ESL education.

There are several differences between the BEA and Title III Part A. Some of these differences include the emphasis on LEP students meeting content-based academic standards and concrete methods of assessment and accountability through AMAOs. The largest difference between Title III and the BEA is the change in pedagogy towards ESL education. Whereas the BEA encouraged bilingual and alternative language learning, Title III emphasizes the importance of English-language instruction and proficiency as soon as possible. Once students obtain proficiency in accordance with the standardized test provided, they no longer receive ESL support or services, and are no longer tested on their English-language proficiency. While supporters of Title III argue that it provides a more rigorous and highly structured approach to monitoring academic and linguistic gains of LEP students, opponents argue that the assessments are not conducive to accurately representing the students’ progress.

== State-based interpretation and implementation ==
SEAs are responsible for determining the logistics of grant allocation and AMAO criterion. This creates a state-to-state inconsistency with fund distribution and program evaluation. For example, in California, funds are allocated to individual LEAs based on the number of LEP and immigrant students under their jurisdiction on a per-pupil basis. LEAs are responsible for submitting a budget as well as expenditure reports detailing the programming and resources that are purchased with the subgrant. In Texas, the formula is also based on a per-pupil formula; however, there is also a minimum amount that each LEA is allowed to receive. In addition, there are separate portions of the funds set aside for areas that experience the most significant increases in LEP.

Texas also recognizes several different language-acquisition programs as valid recipients of ESEA Title III funding, including: transitional bilingual, dual language immersion, content-based ESL instruction, and pull-out ESL instruction. These types of programming are more consistent with the regulations of the Bilingual Education Act (1968), the policy from which the English Language Acquisition, Language Enhancement, and Academic Achievement Act (2001) was generated.
