= Timeline of the Black Power movement =

This is a timeline of the Black Power movement.

== Before 1966 ==
- Congress of Racial Equality (1942)
- COINTELPRO (1956)
- Student Nonviolent Coordinating Committee (1960)
- Assassination of Patrice Lumumba (1961)
- 1961 United Nations floor protest
- The Negro Digest (1961)
- Liberator (1961)
- Group on Advanced Leadership (1961)
- Umbra (1963)
- Revolutionary Action Movement (1962)
- Umbra (1963)
- Soulbook (1964)
- Black Arts Movement (1965)
- Watts riots (1965)
- Assassination of Malcolm X (1965)
- The Autobiography of Malcolm X (1965)
- Black Dialogue (1965)
- US Organization (1965)

== 1966 ==
- Black Panther Party
- Black Guerrilla Family
- Journal of Black Poetry
- Kwanzaa

== 1967 ==
- Operation CHAOS
- Long hot summer of 1967
- Detroit riot of 1967
- Cambridge riot of 1967
- Cairo riot
- Where Do We Go from Here: Chaos or Community?

== 1968 ==
- Memphis sanitation strike
- 1968 Olympics Black Power salute
- Republic of New Afrika
- Death of Bobby Hutton
- Omnibus Crime Control and Safe Streets Act of 1968
- Dodge Revolutionary Union Movement
- Assassination of Martin Luther King, Jr.
- Howard University student protest
- King assassination riots
  - Baltimore
  - Wilmington
  - Louisville
  - Kansas City, Missouri
  - Pittsburgh
  - Chicago
  - Washington, D.C.
- Nommo

== 1969 ==
- Murder of Fred Hampton
- Murder of Mark Clark
- League of Revolutionary Black Workers
- Institute of the Black World
- Sullivan v. Little Hunting Park, Inc.
- Weather Underground
- Gaston County v. United States
- Executive Order 11478
- Alexander v. Holmes County Board of Education
- 1969 York race riot
- Allen v. State Board of Election
- Revised Philadelphia Plan
- Wells v. Rockefeller
- National Conference of Black Political Scientists
- Soul City, North Carolina

== 1970 ==
- Joint Center for Political Studies
- Black Liberation Army
- Black Creation
- Revolutionary People's Constitutional Convention
- Marin County courthouse incident
- Killing of Henry Marrow
- Comprehensive Drug Abuse Prevention and Control Act of 1970
- Jackson State killings
- Voting Rights Act Amendments of 1970
- Carter v. West Feliciana School Board
- Institute for Southern Studies

== 1971 ==
- Congressional Black Caucus
- War on drugs
- Griggs v. Duke Power Co.
- Swann v. Charlotte-Mecklenburg Board of Education
- Attica Prison riot
- Operation PUSH

== 1972 ==
- National Black Political Convention
- Coalition of Black Trade Unionists
- Gary Agenda
- African Liberation Day
- Gates v. Collier
- 1972 Olympics Black Power salute
- MOVE

== 1973 ==
- National Black Feminist Organization
- Revolutionary Suicide
- Drug Enforcement Administration
- Georgia v. United States
- District of Columbia Home Rule Act
- Keyes v. School District No. 1, Denver
- White v. Regester
- Equal Employment Opportunity Act of 1972

== 1974 ==
- Gates v. Collier
- Boston busing desegregation
- Equal Educational Opportunities Act of 1974
- Equal Credit Opportunity Act
- Milliken v. Bradley
- Maynard Jackson

== 1975 ==
- George Jackson Brigade
- Home Mortgage Disclosure Act
- Livernois–Fenkell riot
- Voting Rights Act Amendments of 1975

== See also ==
- Garveyism
- Race (human classification)
- White supremacy
- Jim Crow
- White Panther Party (1968)
