= English-language learner =

Person learning the English language

English-language learner (often abbreviated as ELL) is a term used in some English-speaking countries such as the United States and Canada to describe a person who is learning the English language and has a native language that is not English. Some educational advocates, especially in the United States, classify these students as non-native English speakers or emergent bilinguals. Various other terms are also used to refer to students who are not proficient in English, such as English as a second language (ESL), English as an additional language (EAL), limited English proficient (LEP), culturally and linguistically diverse (CLD), non-native English speaker, bilingual students, heritage language, emergent bilingual, and language-minority students. The legal term that is used in federal legislation is 'limited English proficient'.

The models of instruction and assessment of students, their cultural background, and the attitudes of classroom teachers towards ELLs have all been found to be factors in the achievement of these students. Several methods have been suggested to effectively teach ELLs, including integrating their home cultures into the classroom, involving them in language-appropriate content-area instruction early on, and integrating literature and technology into their learning programs. When teaching ELLs potential issues like assessment and teacher biases, expectations, and use of the language may also be present.

Teachers can also support ELLs by using culturally relevant materials and encouraging them to share their own experiences in class.

== History ==
The term "English-language learner" was first used by Mark LaCelle-Peterson and Charlene Rivera in their 1994 study. He defined ELL students as students whose first language is not English, including both limited and higher levels of language proficiency. The term ELL emphasizes that students are mastering another language, something many monolingual students in American schools may never attempt outside of the limited proficiency gained from foreign language class requirements. In adopting the term, LaCelle-Peterson and Rivera gave analogies of other conventional educational terms. The authors believed that just as we refer to advanced teaching candidates as "student teachers" rather than "limited teaching proficient individuals," the term ELL underscores what students are learning instead of their limitations.

Since 1872, an English-only instruction law had been in place in the United States. It was not until 1967 that the legislation was overturned by SB53, a policy signed for California public schools to allow other languages in instruction. A year later, after SB53 garnered support by the immigrant community, the Bilingual Education Act (Title VII) was passed. Nationally, public schools were then provided funding for programs that met the educational needs of ELL.

Not long after the installment of Title VII, the "taxpayers revolt" came to fruition and California's Proposition 13 was drafted. It proposed funding cuts for large portions of California's public schools, backed by those who disapproved of immigrant progress. In opposition to this, cases like Castaneda v Pickard fought for educational equality and standards focused on developing ELL students, as well as an overall sound plan for school districts. An additional setback occurred in California in 1998 when Proposition 227 passed, banning bilingual education yet again. To combat this, education advocates in the Bay Area began to open all-inclusive schools to promote the acceptance of ELL students.

== Models of instruction ==
There are a wide variety of different program models that may be used to structure the education of English-language learners (ELLs). These program models vary depending on the goals of the program and the resources available. Some researchers describe program models as existing on a spectrum from more monolingual forms to more bilingual forms. Others distinguish between English-only program models and bilingual program models.

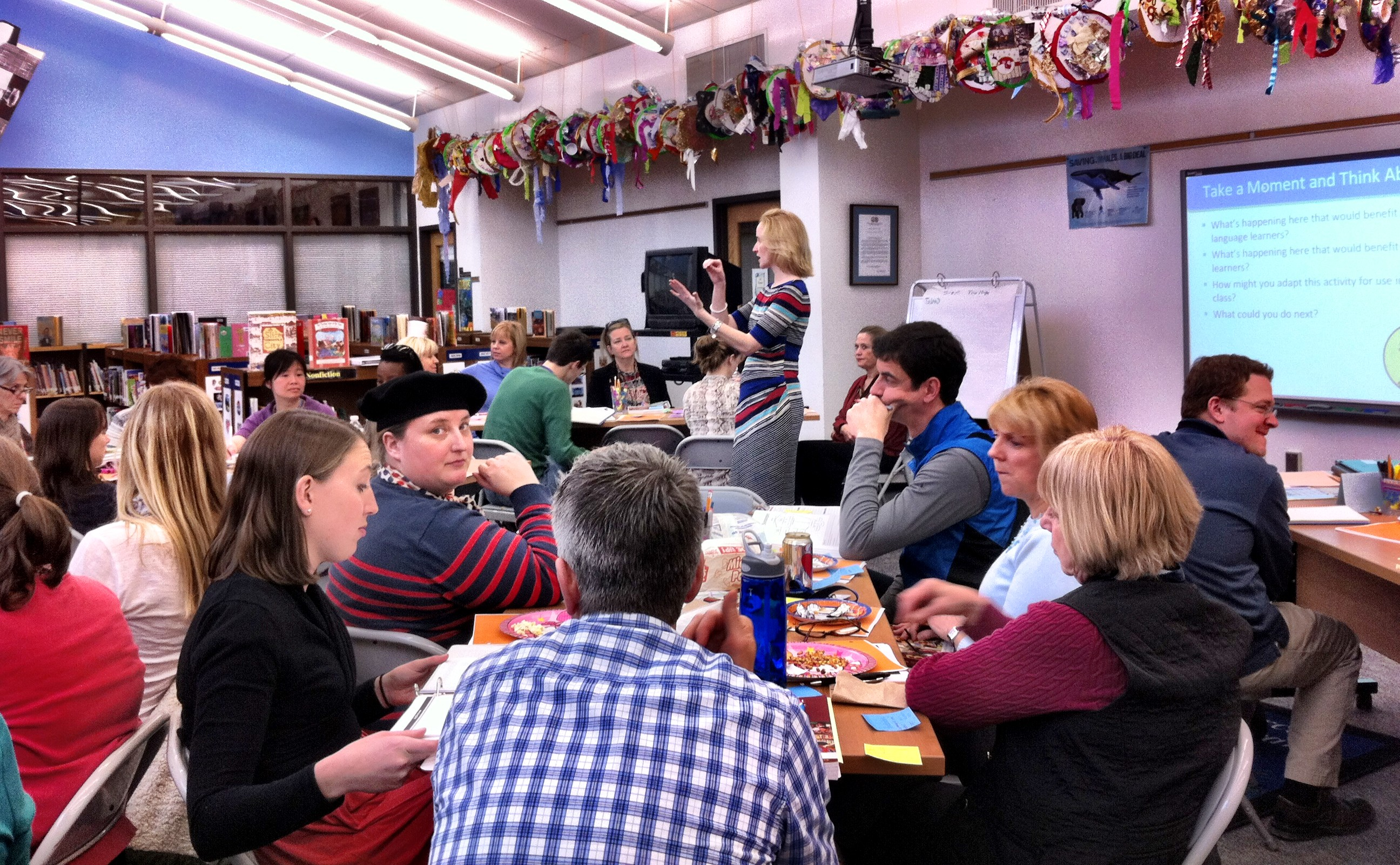
At a professional development seminar, educators learn about the Sheltered Instruction Observation Protocol (SIOP) model, a specific model of sheltered instruction used to accommodate English-language learners in mainstream classrooms.

Fast-track to English programs encourage students to use English as quickly as possible and offer little to no native language support. In transition-bilingual programs, instruction begins in the student's native language and then switches to English in elementary or middle school. In dual language programs (also known as two-way bilingual or two-way immersion programs), students become fluent simultaneously in their native language and English. Sheltered instruction is another approach in which integrates language and content instruction in the mainstream classroom environment. Program models utilizing sheltered instruction may also be referred to as content-based instruction (CBI) or content language integrated learning (CLIL).

=== "Push-in" programs versus "pull-out" programs ===
Two specific models of instruction include the push-in program and the pull-out program.

The push-in program includes the English teacher coming into the classroom to aid the English-language learner. The benefit of this method is that students remain integrated in the classroom with their native English-speaking peers. This method does not isolate or single out ELL students; However, this method can present challenges in co-teaching, as the educators must work together to collaborate in the classroom. In schools using a push-in style of teaching, educators disagree over whether ELL students should be encouraged or permitted to participate in additional foreign language classes, such as French. Some educators argue that learning another additional language while learning English might be too challenging for ELLs, or that ELLs should focus on their English proficiency before attempting further languages. Other educators insist that foreign language classes are the only classes that put ELL students on a level playing field with their peers, and furthermore that research may suggest that ELL students perform better in foreign language classes than their peers.

The pull-out program entails the ELL student learning in a separate classroom with the English teacher. The benefit of such a method is that ELL students receive individualized, focused training. Unfortunately, this method can isolate ELL students from the rest of their peers, leaving them feeling left out from the community.

== Instructional practices ==
In a five-week study by J. Huang, research showed that "classroom instruction appeared to play an important role in integrating language skills development and academic content learning." This study also highlighted that the "students acquire linguistic/literacy skills and scientific knowledge hand in hand as they assume various communicative and social roles within carefully planned language activities." By tying scientific content in English, the students were able to improve their language development between drafts and build upon their existing knowledge of scientific content as well.

Illustration of Lev Vygotsky's theory of the zone of proximal development (ZPD). The central ring represents the tasks that a learner can complete on their own; the middle ring represents the tasks that a learner can do with expert guidance, but not without it (the ZPD); and the outer ring represents the tasks that a learner can not yet do, even with expert guidance.

=== Scaffolding ===
Scaffolding theory was introduced in 1976 by Jerome Bruner, David Wood, and Gail Ross. Bruner adapts Lev Vygotsky's zone of proximal development theory to child development. In the context of aiding ELL students, scaffolding is seen as a way to offer more support to ELL students initially through additional strategies and approaches, which are gradually removed as the student gains independence and proficiency. Different scaffolding strategies include associating English vocabulary to visuals, drawing back to a student's prior knowledge, pre-teaching difficult vocabulary before assigning readings they appear in, and encouraging questions from students, whether they be content-related or to ensure comprehension. All of these additional areas of support are to be gradually removed, so that students become more independent, even if that means no longer needing some of these associations or seeking them out for themselves.

=== Labor-based grading ===
In Asao Inoue's "Labor-Based Grading Contracts", he proposes an alternative to traditional content-based or quality-based methods of assessment in writing classrooms. Inoue outlines his own innovative classroom design, which assigns grades based on set standards for how much work is put into each assignment through quantitative methods such as word counts. High marks are earned by students who go above the baseline requirements, which earn students a "B" on the A–F grading scale. The intent behind Inoue's design is that students are rewarded for their efforts rather than deterred, and students who traditionally score poorly when graded on quality (such as ELL students) are equally capable of receiving a certain grade as any other student, despite any educational setbacks or challenges they endure. A unique aspect to the labor-based grading design is that students collaborate as a class to decide what the terms on conditions of grading scales are. This way, all student's voices are heard and considered when developing a method of evaluation for their work.

== Potential issues faced by ELLs ==
=== Assessment biases ===
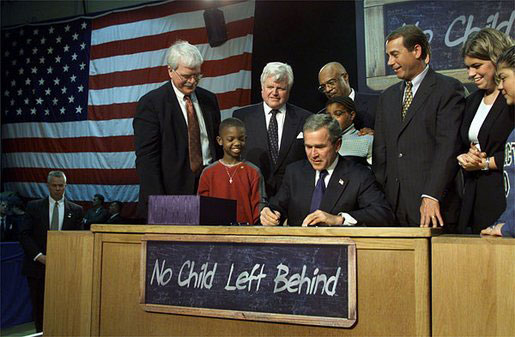
George W. Bush signing the No Child Left Behind Act.

The Every Student Succeeds Act or ESSA passed in 2015 requires all ELLs attending public schools from grades K–12 to be assessed in multiple language domains, such as listening, reading, writing, and speaking. Current research in this area has found that assessments given to ELLs are culturally and linguistically inappropriate for reliable testing. Assessments do not take into account the students' linguistic repertoire and what they know in their first language; therefore, content-based assessment outcomes might be confounded by language barriers, since they are not only being exposed to new material, but they are learning this new material in a language that they may still be gaining proficiency in. Research based on student feedback indicates that students have a difficult time associating the content presented to them in assessments with their personal lives. This lack of variety in assessments may restrict teachers' ability to accurately determine the academic progress of a student and introduce biases that may result in lower test scores.

=== Teacher biases and training ===
Attitudes of educators play a major role in the ESL classroom. Estimates suggest that approximately 45% of teachers in America have ELL students in their classrooms; however, it is not uncommon for teachers to have negative perceptions of the ELL students in their classrooms. These negative perceptions are informed by a bias that ELL students are not adequately trying or that they are personally at fault for their language barrier. Research shows that the negative attitudes of teachers may stem from lack of time to address unique ELL student classroom needs, added teacher workload when working with ELL students in mainstream classrooms, and personal feelings of professional insufficiency to work with ELL students. Research indicates that nearly half (47.4%) of teachers working with ELL students felt as though they did not have the proper training to best support these learners and about 39% of teachers did not feel prepared to support them in the classroom.

These attitudes can also lead to biases in the way students are assessed and evaluated. ELL students tend underrate or under-evaluate academic skills of ELL students than English dominant peers, this can affect academic growth, ELL reclassification to English proficient, and even referral to special education services. Some researchers state that more multicultural education or trainings for teachers can help change these biases, along with more teachers of color that are representative of their students can help with less biases and lead to better evaluations of ELLs. Teachers can also become more aware of the issues faced by ELLs along with how language is developed and the issues with language development.

=== Culture ===
A study to examine anti-racist pedagogy within predominantly white versus predominantly Mexican classrooms concluded that Mexican elementary-level students had a firmer grasp on cultural inequalities. According to the findings, the social and cultural maturity of the Mexican students is a direct result of having faced the inequalities themselves. Another study on Caucasian first-grade teachers and their ELL students indicated biases that ultimately affected students' desire to learn. A combination of misinformation, stereotypes, and individual reservations can alter teachers' perception when working with culturally diverse or non-native English speakers. Teachers are placed in the position to teach English-learning students, sometimes without the necessary training, as mentioned above. From a Walden University study, a handful of teachers at an elementary school expressed not having the energy, training, or time to perform for these students.

An ESL teacher, in a study called "Losing Strangeness to Mediate ESL Teaching", "connects culture to religious celebrations and holidays and the fusion invites students to share their knowledge". This has encouraged students to open up and talk about their cultural backgrounds and traditions. "Teachers who encourage CLD students to maintain their cultural or ethnic ties promote their personal and academic success." Students should not feel that they need to lose their identity in the classroom, but rather that they gain knowledge from both their culture and the world around them. It have been proven to be beneficial to bring culture into the ESL classroom for the students to feel a sense of worth in school and in their lives. Similarly, the sharing one different cultural backgrounds can benefit other students in the mainstream classroom who may not have the cultural maturity or dual identities that these students are able to shed a light on.

Another reason that an ESL student may be struggling to join discussions and engage in class could be attributed to whether they come from a culture where speaking up to an authority figure (like a teacher or a professor) is discouraged. This makes classes that are graded based on participation especially challenging for these students. Strategies that can mitigate this discomfort or misunderstanding of expectations include offering surveys or reflective writing prompts, that are collected after class, inquiring about student's educational and cultural backgrounds and past learning experiences. Regardless of how much training an instructor has on teaching ELL students, being open to learning about them as an individual rather than a part of a larger group and making efforts towards tailoring and personalizing their learning experience can contribute to the student's overall success.

Outside of the classroom, ELL students are otherwise institutionally marginalized, as well. They often sit at separate lunch tables and are under-recognized in school assemblies.

=== Prompts and expectations ===
Aside from linguistic gaps, the adjustment to American scholarly expectations, writing genres, and prompts can all be jarring and even contradictory to an ELL individual's academic experiences from their home country. An example of this is how American writing prompts tend to be multiple pages long, with extensive details and examples. Many collegiate ELLs can be overwhelmed and confused by all of the additional information, making it difficult to decipher all of the different parts that their writing needs to address. Another example is found in how students from other countries may be unfamiliar with sharing their opinions, or criticizing the government in any form, even if this is a requirement for an essay or a speech. According to a survey by Lin (2015), "Many [ELL students] indicated that they had problems adjusting their ways of writing in their first language to American thought patterns. Students still thought in their first language and used the rhetorical patterns of their first language to write English essays… Because writing patterns or styles are not only cognitively but also culturally embedded, many ELL writers in this study found it takes a significant amount of time to adapt to different thinking patterns when communicating through written English."

=== Use of native language ===
ELLs may find themselves using their native language most of the time, rather than practicing their new language, and this may impede their progress. When using the acquired second language, many ELLs enter a stage called "the silent period." During this period the ELL is familiar with the language but does not use it. This period of not speaking can last 6 weeks or more depending on the person.

Once ELLs begins to use the second language they typically use brief phrases and short words. With time, they may begin to feel more comfortable with using the new language. The length of duration for an ELL to become fluent in the second language depends on the individual and their strength in their native language.

== ELLs with disabilities ==
Of the 5 million ELL students in the 2019–2020 school year, 15.3% of these or 766,600 were identified with disabilities and qualified for special education services. ELLs with disabilities follow the same path to receiving services for special education: academic struggle is observed by those working with the student, the student is referred to a team of professionals for intervention and/or assessment, if a disability is found they are then placed in special education programming for support. Most ELL students with disabilities qualify under the specific learning disability or speech and language impairment categories.

Researchers have found that there are disproportionate numbers of in ELL students identified as in need of special education. There can be overrepresentation where ELL students are qualified into special education services due to underlying language issues but do not truly have a disability, or there can be underrepresentation when a disability exists but the ELL student is not qualified into special education because a disability is assumed to be a language development related issue.Information from standardized tests, direct observation, and parent feedback are used to diagnose the root causes for language learning students who struggle with academics. When classifying the disability or impairment, the intrinsic and extrinsic factors considered are:

- Environment
- The child as a whole
- Students' strengths during meaningful activities
- Student progression in relation to their peers

== Enriching the classroom environment ==
To maintain an environment that is beneficial for both the teacher and the student, culture, literature, and other disciplines should be integrated systematically into the instruction. Postponing content-area instruction until CLD students gain academic language skills bridges the linguistic achievement gap between the learners and their native-English speaking peers. Relating to culture, teachers need to integrate it into the lesson, for the students to feel a sense of appreciation and a feeling of self-worth rather than ostracization. When working with English-language learners, it is suggested that teachers try to understand the cultural background of their students in relation to education. What might be incorrect in English, might be correct in one's native language. If this is the case, then the student may transfer information from their first language to the second. Students will benefit substantially from the use of literature in instruction as well. "Reading texts that match learner interests and English proficiency provide learners with comprehensible language input—a chance to learn new vocabulary in context and to see the syntax of the language." Motivation and enjoyment can be reached through the addition of literature and writing that is focused on culturally relevant topics that allow students to express where they come from and aspects of their culture. By integrating other disciplines into the lesson, it will make the content more significant to the learners and will create higher order thinking skills across the areas. Introducing language in other contexts focuses not only on learning a second language, but using that language as a medium to learn mathematics, science, social studies, or other academic subjects. These varying approaches aid ELL students' awareness "that English is not just an object of academic interest nor merely a key to passing an examination; instead, English becomes a real means of interaction and sharing among people". Therefore, students will be able to communicate across the curriculum, acquire higher level skills, and be successful in their daily lives.

=== Strategies for supporting ELLs in the classroom and beyond ===
Allowing students to translanguage, or alternate, between English and their native language is an essential strategy for English-language learners. In the classroom, English-language learners can often feel intimidated when asked to speak or communicate complex ideas, so when students are allowed to use their first language to help produce their second language, it lessens some of the anxiety that can occur. In these cases, teachers may be less concerned about students' language output than if they are able to express their thoughts. The use of translanguage in the classroom, allows students to process and convey their ideas in a lower-risk output situation (worksheets) that can lead to more high-risk output situations (essays and projects).

When it comes to writing, constant and a varied feedback should be provided. Feedback can be given using a rubric that addresses grammatical concepts such as syntax. Modeling effective writing is also an essential strategy, which can be done by vocalizing their reasoning for choice in vocabulary, sentence structure, and even purpose for writing. Teachers can chunk writing steps into manageable sections for English-language learners.

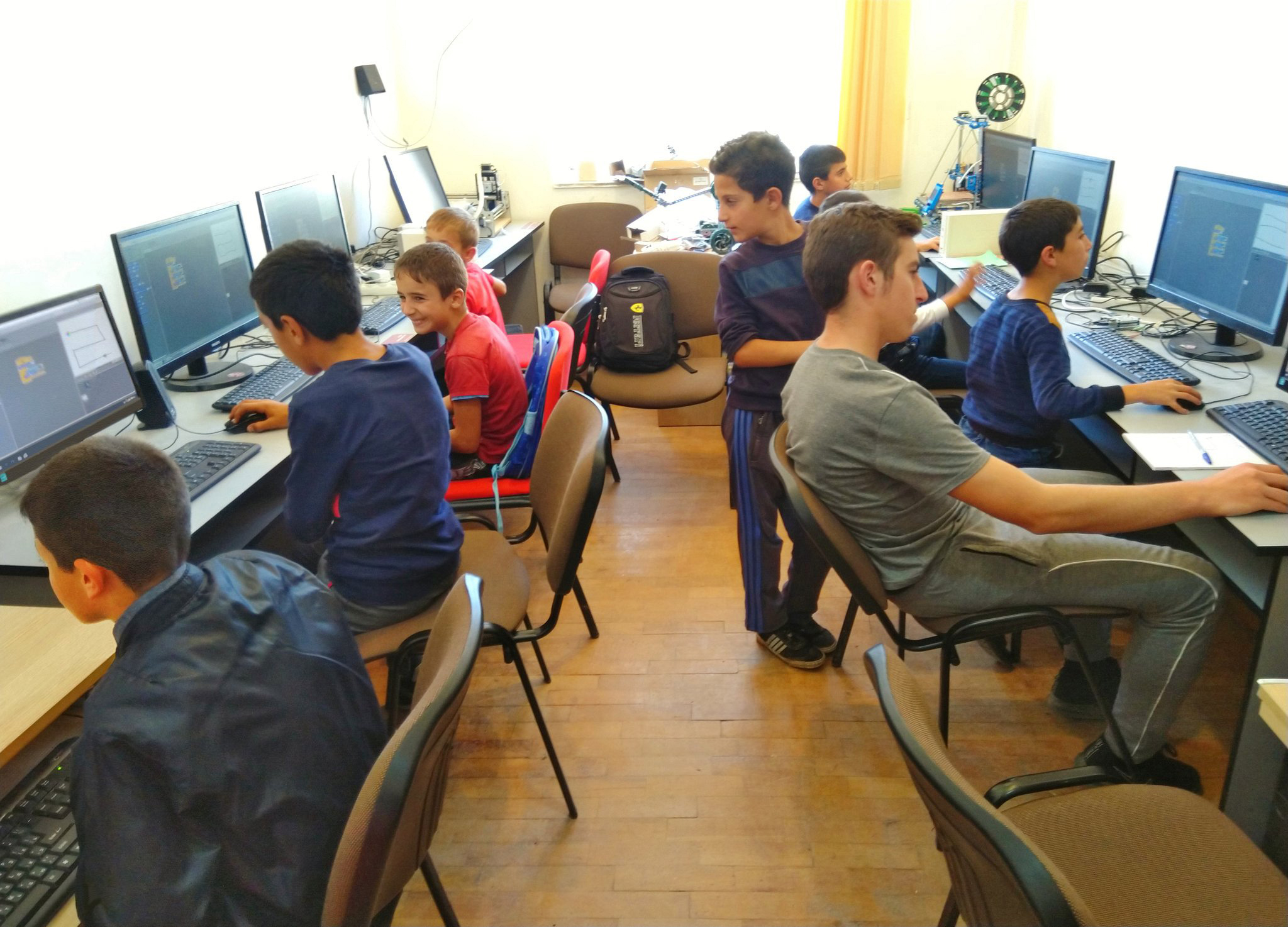
Technology usage in the classroom can be beneficial for English-language learners.

Incorporating technology supports the language development of ELLs in the classroom. The internet makes it possible for students to view videos of activities, events, and places around the world instantaneously. Viewing these activities can help English-language learners develop an understanding of new concepts while at the same time building topic related schema (background knowledge). Introducing students to media literacy and accessible materials can also aid them in their future academic endeavors and establish research skills early on. For English-language learners, listening all the time can become very taxing, so teachers should add in visuals as much as they can to support students. Technology allows teachers to help students visually because images can be projected on the screen as well as text when learning new concepts.

Experiential learning is another strategy to support ELL students. The teacher can provide opportunities for English-language learners to acquire vocabulary and build knowledge through hands-on learning. This can include activities such as science experiments and art projects, which are tactile ways that encourage students to create solutions to proposed problems or tasks.

A strategy that requires more involvement from educators is supporting the students outside of the school setting. To respond to deficiencies in the public school system, educators and student activists have created spaces that work to uplift ELL and their families. Labeled as family-school-community partnerships, these spaces have sought out cultural and linguistic responsiveness through encouraging participation and addressing needs outside of school. It is an interpretation of growth through art and community bonding meant to prime student development.

== Future ==
While there have been several advancements in both the rights and the strategies and support offered in the United States and Canada for English-language learning students, there is still much work to be done. Despite International students (who often make up the bulk of ELL students in higher education, in addition to immigrants) being sought out as sources of profit and their boosts of collegiate diversity statistics, there are not always additional funding and resources curated to support these students at their respective institutions. With efforts like former U.S. president Donald J. Trump's proposed deportation of international students as a result of the COVID-19 pandemic, and the ongoing debate whether to continue to support pathways to citizenship and achievement by the children of undocumented immigrants, such as DACA, there are still many hindrances to this group of students occurring today. Adoption of socially-just classroom pedagogies such as those proposed by Asao Inoue, and the re-examination of the privileges inherent in the existence of "Standard Academic English" are current steps towards a trajectory of inclusion and tolerance for these groups of students in both K–12 and higher education.
