= Elementary and Secondary Education Act =

1965 US law

Elementary and Secondary Education Act of 1965
- Enacted by: the 89th United States Congress

Citations
- Public law: Pub. L. 89–10
- Statutes at Large: 79 Stat. 27

Codification
- Acts amended: Pub. L. 81–874, 64 Stat. 1100; Pub. L. 83–531, 68 Stat. 533
- Titles amended: 20 U.S.C.: Education
- U.S.C. sections created: 20 U.S.C. ch. 70

Legislative history
- Introduced in the House as H.R. 2362; Passed the House on March 26, 1965 (263–153); Passed the Senate on April 9, 1965 (73–18); Signed into law by President Lyndon B. Johnson on April 11, 1965

Major amendments
- Bilingual Education Act; Education Amendments of 1972; Equal Educational Opportunities Act of 1974; Improving America's Schools Act of 1994; No Child Left Behind Act; Every Student Succeeds Act; Education Consolidation and Improvement Act

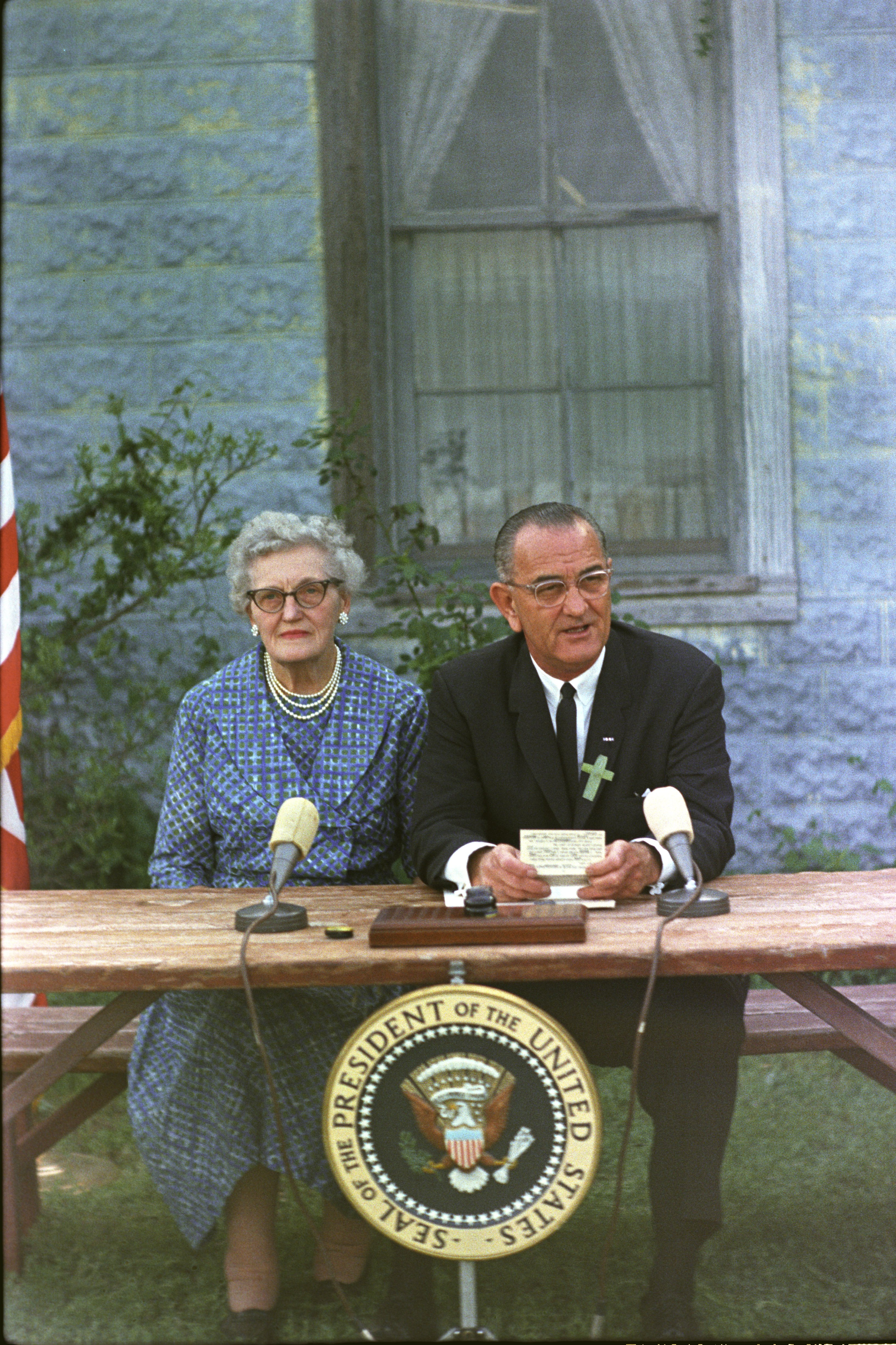
Lyndon B. Johnson at the ESEA signing ceremony, with his childhood schoolteacher Ms. Kate Deadrich Loney

The Elementary and Secondary Education Act (ESEA) was passed by the 89th United States Congress and signed into law by President Lyndon B. Johnson on April 11, 1965. Part of Johnson's War on Poverty, the act has been one of the most far-reaching laws affecting education passed by the United States Congress, and was reauthorized by the No Child Left Behind Act of 2001.

Johnson proposed a major reform of federal education policy in the aftermath of his landslide victory in the 1964 United States presidential election, and his proposal quickly led to the passage of the Elementary and Secondary Education Act. The act provides federal funding to primary and secondary education, with funds authorized for professional development, instructional materials, resources to support educational programs, and parental involvement promotion. The act emphasizes equal access to education, aiming to shorten the achievement gaps between students by providing federal funding to support schools with children from impoverished families.

Since 1965, ESEA has been modified and reauthorized by Congress several times. The Bilingual Education Act provides support for bilingual education and educational efforts for Native Americans and other groups. The Equal Educational Opportunities Act of 1974 prohibits discrimination against students and teachers. The No Child Left Behind Act (NCLB) introduced a testing regime designed to promote standards-based education. The Every Student Succeeds Act retained some of the testing requirements established by the NCLB, but shifted accountability provisions to the states.

== Historical context ==
President Lyndon B. Johnson, whose own ticket out of poverty was a public education in Texas, fervently believed that education was a cure for ignorance and poverty. Education funding in the 1960s was especially tight due to the demographic challenges posed by the large Baby Boomer generation, but Congress had repeatedly rejected increased federal financing for public schools. Buoyed by his landslide victory in the 1964 election, Johnson sought to dramatically increase federal funding for education at the start of his second term.

On January 25, 1965, President Johnson called for congressional efforts to improve education opportunities for America's children. Wary of popular fears regarding increased federal involvement in local schools, the Johnson administration advocated giving local districts great leeway to use the new funds, which were to be first distributed as grants to each state. Shortly thereafter, Carl D. Perkins (D-KY), the chair of the General Education Subcommittee of the House Committee on Education and Labor introduced H.R. 2362. With the Johnson administration's support, and after significant wrangling over the structure of the bill's funding formula committee, the full committee voted 23–8 to report it on March 2, 1965. Following a failed attempt to derail the bill by Representative Howard W. Smith (D-VA), the House passed H.R. 2362 on March 26, 1965, in a 263–153 roll-call vote.

As the Senate prepared to consider the education bill, S. 370, Democratic leaders urged their colleagues to pass it without amendment, in hopes of avoiding the bill being returned to the House to endure further reconsideration. S. 370 was assigned to the Senate Labor and Public Welfare Committee, which subsequently reported the bill to the Senate floor with unanimous support. During the Senate debates, several amendments were introduced, though none passed. The Senate passed the bill in a 73–18 vote on April 7, 1965.

President Johnson signed the Elementary and Secondary Education Act into law two days later on April 9, 1965. For the first time, large amounts of federal money went to public schools. In practice ESEA meant helping all public school districts, with more money going to districts that had large proportions of students from poor families (which included all the big cities). Also for the first time, private schools (most of them Catholic schools in the inner cities) received services, such as library funding, comprising about 12 percent of the ESEA budget. Though federal funds were involved, they were administered by local officials, and by 1977 it was reported that less than half of the funds were applied toward the education of children under the poverty line. Presidential biographer Robert Dallek further reports that researchers cited by Hugh Davis Graham soon found that poverty had more to do with family background and neighborhood conditions than the quantity of education a child received. Early studies suggested initial improvements for poor children helped by ESEA reading and math programs, but later assessments indicated that benefits faded quickly and left pupils little better off than those not in the schemes.

== Sections of the original 1965 Act ==
- Title I – Financial Assistance To Local Educational Agencies For The Education Of Children Of Low-Income Families
- Title II – School Library Resources, Textbooks, and other Instructional Materials
- Title III – Supplementary Educational Centers and Services
- Title IV – Educational Research And Training
- Title V – Grants To Strengthen State Departments Of Education
- Title VI – General Provisions

New Titles Created by Early Amendments to 1965 Law

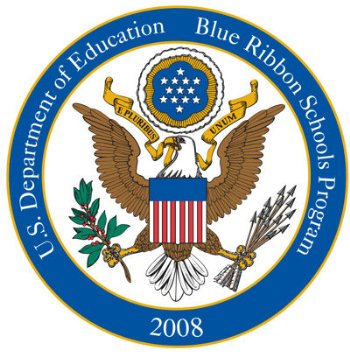
2008 No Child Left Behind Blue Ribbon School Logo

1966 amendments (Public Law 89-750)

- Title VI – Aid to Handicapped Children (1965 title VI becomes Title VII).

1967 amendments (Public Law 90-247)

- Title VII – Bilingual Education Programs (1966 title VII becomes Title VIII).

=== Title I ===
==== Overview ====
Title I ("Title One"), which is a provision of the Elementary and Secondary Education Act passed in 1965, is a program created by the U.S. Department of Education to distribute funding to schools and school districts with a high percentage of students from low-income families, with the intention to create programs that will better aid children who have special needs that, without funding, could not be properly supported. Funding is distributed first to state educational agencies (SEAs) which then allocate funds to local educational agencies (LEAs) which in turn dispense funds to public schools in need. Title I also helps children from families that have migrated to the United States and youth from intervention programs who are neglected or at risk of abuse. The act allocates money for educational purposes for the next five fiscal years until it is reauthorized. In addition, Title I appropriates money to the education system for the prosecution of high retention rates of students and the improvement of schools; these appropriations are carried out for five fiscal years until reauthorization. Funding for the Title I program could be facing substantial cuts as president Donald Trump’s plans take shape.

According to the National Center for Education Statistics, to be an eligible Title I school, at least 40% of a school's students must be from low-income families who qualify under the U.S. Census' definition of low-income, according to the U.S. Department of Education.

Title I mandates services to both eligible public school and private school students. This is outlined in section 1120 of Title I, Part A of the ESEA as amended by the No Child Left Behind Act (NCLB). Title I states that it gives priority to schools that are in obvious need of funds, low-achieving schools, and schools that demonstrate a commitment to improving their education standards and test scores.

There are two types of assistance that can be provided by Title I funds. The first is a “schoolwide program” in which schools can dispense resources in a flexible manner. The second is a “targeted assistance program” which allows schools to identify students who are failing or at risk of failing.

Assistance for school improvement includes government grants, allocations, and reallocations based on the school's willingness to commit to improving their standing in the educational system. Each educational institution requesting these grants must submit an application that describes how these funds will be used in restructuring their school for academic improvement.

Schools receiving Title I funding are regulated by federal legislation. Most recently, this legislation includes the No Child Left Behind Act, which was passed in 2001. In the 2006–2007 school year, Title I provided assistance to over 17 million students who range from kindergarten through twelfth grade. The majority of the funds (60%) were given to students between kindergarten through fifth grade. The next highest group that received funding were students in sixth through eighth grade (21%). Finally, 16% of the funds went to students in high school, and 3% provided to students in preschool.

==== Historical context ====
In its original conception, Title I under the ESEA was designed by President Lyndon B. Johnson to close the skill gap in reading, writing, and mathematics between children from low-income households who attend urban or rural school systems and children from the middle-class who attend suburban school systems. This federal law came about during President Johnson's War on Poverty agenda. Numerous studies have been conducted since the original authorization of the ESEA in 1965 that have shown that there is an inverse relationship between student achievement and school poverty. Specifically, student achievement has been found to decrease as school poverty increases. According to the United States Department of Education (USDOE), students from low-income households are “three times as likely to be low achievers if they attend high-poverty schools as compared to low-poverty schools.” Within this context, Title I was conceived in order to compensate for the considerable educational deprivations associated with child poverty.

===== First 15 years =====
In the years following 1965, Title I has changed considerably. For the first 15 years, the program was reauthorized every three years with additional emphasis placed on how funds were to be allocated. In the course of these reauthorizations, strict federal rules and regulations have been created for the guarantee that funds would be allocated solely to students in need – specifically students eligible for services based on socioeconomic status and academic achievement.

Regulations also included added attention to uniformity in regards to how resources were distributed to Title I and non-Title I schools as well as the role of parents in the revisions of the program. In addition to more stringent rules, during these years, policy makers outlined punitive actions that could be taken for those who were out of compliance. Attention was also placed upon the assurance that Title I funds would not serve as replacements for local funds; but rather they would serve as subsidiary resources. These federal regulations, which were focused on financial resources, influenced local Title I programs in many ways. Pull-out programs were adopted by Title I schools in order to comply with the financial stipulations that were made in the initial reauthorizations. These programs separated eligible students from ineligible ones to ensure that those who were in-need would benefit from the program. By 1978, in response to the extensive criticism of pull-outs on the grounds that they were asynchronous with the instruction occurring in classrooms, another option for providing assistance to students was introduced, the school wide approach. Schools with a student body in which the make-up had 100% or more low-income students could use Title I funds for the entire school's improvement rather than for specific individuals. Despite this amendment, local fund requirements prevented all eligible students from using the school wide approach.

===== The 1980s =====
During the Reagan administration, Congress passed the Education Consolidation and Improvement Act (ECIA) in 1981 to reduce federal regulations of Title I. This reflected the administration's stance that resource control should be in the hands of states and local jurisdictions rather than at a federal level. Despite the change outlined by the ECIA and the new designation of Title I as Chapter I, little was done to implement it and traditional Title I practices, like the use of pull-outs, continued.

As the financial regulations became incorporated into practice, the conversation shifted around Title I to student achievement. In 1988, the Hawkins-Stafford Elementary and Secondary School Improvement Act, re-focused Title I on cultivating school improvement and excellent programs. The additions that were made through this legislation called for synchrony between Chapter I and classroom instruction, it raised the achievement standard for low-income students by emphasizing advanced skills instead of basic ones and increased parental involvement. It also had two new provisions: program improvement and school wide projects. Program improvements were modifications that would occur when students who received funding were not improving. The school wide projects altered the requirement that local funds had to match school wide program funding by Title I, allowing a larger number of high need schools to implement school wide programming.

===== From the 1990s to the present =====
A 1993 National Assessment noted shortcomings of the 1980s alterations to Title I. These catalyzed the introduction of the 1994 Improving America's Schools Act (IASA), which significantly revised the original ESEA.

This was the last major alteration prior to those made by No Child Left Behind. The IASA attempted to coordinate federal resources and policies with the pre-existing efforts at the state and local levels in order to improve instruction for all students. This reform made three major changes to Title I. It added math and reading/language arts standards to be used to assess student progress and provide accountability. It reduced the threshold for schools to implement school-wide programs from 75% poverty to 50% and gave schools a longer rein to use federal funding from multiple programs to dispense funds at a school wide level. Lastly, the IASA gave more local control overall so that federal officials and states could waive federal requirements that interfered with school improvements.

The most recent and significant alteration to the original Title I was made by its reauthorization under No Child Left Behind (NCLB). In this reauthorization, NCLB required increased accountability from its schools both from the teachers and from the students. Yearly standardized tests were mandated in order to measure how schools were performing against the achievement bars set by Title I. Schools were also responsible for publishing annual report cards that detailed their student achievement data and demographics. Schools were now held accountable not only by punitive measures that would be taken if schools fail to meet Adequate Yearly Progress (AYP), but also corrective actions were taken if states did not have an assessment system approved by Title I. Under the NCLB, Schools are also required to plan for “restructuring” if they fail to make AYP for three years after being identified for improvement. More schools took corrective action under NCLB than under IASA. NCLB also required teachers to be highly qualified if hired using Title I funding.

==== Funding ====
Under NCLB, Title I funding is given to schools where at least 35% of the children in the school attendance area come from low-income families or to schools where 35% of the student population is low-income. To determine the percentage of low-income families, school districts may select a poverty measure from among the following data sources: (1) the number of children ages 5–17 in poverty counted in the most recent census; (2) the number of children eligible for free and reduced price lunches under the National School Lunch Program; (3) the number of children in families receiving Temporary Assistance for Needy Families; (4) the number of children eligible to receive Medicaid assistance; or (5) a composite of these data sources. The district must use the same measure to rank all its school attendance areas. The funds are appropriated for the use of improving academic achievement for students in low-income households.

Title I funding is received by more than 50% of all public schools. NCLB also requires that for funding to be received, all districts and schools must meet adequate yearly progress goals for their student populations and specific demographic subgroups. Non-Title I schools are schools that do not receive federal Title I funds. Although school districts have some freedom in how Title I funding is distributed among schools within a district, Title I requires them to prioritize the highest-poverty schools.

There are four distribution formulas under NCLB for Title I funding: Basic Grant, Concentration Grant, Targeted Assistance Grant, and the Education Finance Incentive Grant. Congress originally stipulated that funding be distributed using the Basic Grant formula. Over time, Congress added the other formulas to better target funding to places with high levels of poverty. The Federal Education Budget Project details the requirements for each formula extensively. All of the grants mentioned above are designed to close the gap in education resources in underserved and funded communities However, political factors may also shape the formulas as school districts represented by powerful members of Congress receive a disproportionate share of funding.

===== Basic Grant =====
The Basic Grant formula provides funding to school districts based on the number of low income children they serve and state education spending. To receive money through this grant, the school district must meet the requirement of having at least 10 poor children and 2% of its students in poverty.

===== Concentration Grant =====
The Concentration Grant formula is similar to the basic grant formula in the regard that funding is given to schools based on the number of low income children they serve. In order to receive money through this grant, school districts must meet the requirement of having at least 15% of children in poverty or a total of 6,500 poor children.

===== Targeted Assistance Grant =====
The Targeted Assistance Grant formula allocates more money for each child as the poverty rate in a district increases. This means that school districts with more poverty get more money for each poor child than districts with low poverty.

===== Education Finance Incentive Grant =====
The Education Finance Incentive Grant Formula is two-pronged approach. Its main intention is to reward schools that expend more state resources on public education and distribute funding in an equitable manner. It is also meant to concentrate funds in districts with high poverty that inequitably distribute state and local education funding. In states, funding is allocated to school districts in a way similar to the Targeted Assistance Grant formula but the weight of schools in districts with high poverty that inequitably distribute funding is doubled.

Since 2001, Federal Title I funding has increased by 88%. In dollars, this has been a $7.7 billion increase. These funds were distributed through the Targeted Assistance and Education Finance Incentive Grant formulas, which target funds to disadvantaged students most directly.

=== Title II ===
Title II funds are used in two ways: to train, prepare, and recruit high quality teachers and principals, and to enhance teacher quality through ongoing professional development.

=== Title III ===
Title III of the ESEA originally provided matching grants for supplementary education centers (Political Education, Cross 2004).

Title III was the innovations component of ESEA. It was, for its time, the greatest federal investment in education innovation ever. Its best innovations, after validation, became part of the National Diffusion Network.

=== Title V ===
This section of the original ESEA provided for strengthening state departments of education (Political Education, Cross 2004). The original Title V was amended to state the purposes of education reform efforts between local and state educational systems. Title V states that the government should endorse and support local education reforms that parallel reforms occurring at the state level. Parts of this section also state that the government should support innovative programs that help to improve an educational system. This includes support programs for libraries, scientific research leading to state and local educational agencies to put promising reforms into place, as well as for programs to improve teacher performance.

Title V also provides government grants given to educational institutions appropriating money to gifted programs for students, foreign language developers, as well as physical education, the arts, and overall mental health care of children and students.

=== Title VI ===
This section of the original ESEA had a number of general provisions, such Section 601, which defined various terms used throughout the ESEA.

Section 604 of the original ESEA prohibited the federal government from using the ESEA as the basis for a national curriculum. It provided that nothing in the act shall be construed as giving the federal government control over the curriculum, program of administration, personnel, or administration of any educational institution or school system. A similar section is still in effect today.

=== Title VII ===
Added during the 1967 reauthorization of ESEA, Title VII introduced a program for bilingual education. It was championed by Texas Democrat Ralph Yarborough (Political Education, Cross 2004). It was originally created to aid Spanish-speaking students. However, in 1968 it transformed to the all-encompassing Bilingual Education Act (BEA). In its original form, the BEA was not explicit in mandating that all school districts provide bilingual education services—it left much room for interpretation by districts. The ruling in Lau v. Nichols provided some clarity—specific program goals were established, support centers for bilingual education were created, and what a “bilingual education program” should look like was defined. The courts upheld the language of the BEA as it declared a “bilingual education program” as one providing English instruction in unison with the native language. The idea was to push students to high academic achievement via a program encouraging them to learn English while maintaining the native language. "It proposed to cultivate in this child his ancestral pride, to reinforce (not destroy) the language he natively speaks, to cultivate his inherent strengths, to give him the sense of personal identification so essential to social maturation," summarizes Professor Cordasco of Montclair State College.

In addition to programs for bilingual students, Title VII implemented plans to help Indian, Native Hawaiian, and Alaskan natives be provided opportunities for achieving academic equality. In late 1967, Congress gave $7.5 million to school districts, scholars, and private research groups who proposed the best programs for improving bilingual education. This section of the ESEA promotes the federal government working closely with local educational institutions to ensure that Indian, Hawaiian, and Alaskan students are being aided in getting the same educational experiences as all other students. This is achieved through programs that keep cultural values intact and push students to strive for academic excellence.

It is worth noting that Title VII was replaced in a reauthorization of the ESEA, the No Child Left Behind Act of 2001, becoming Title III “Language Instruction for Limited English Proficient and Immigrant Students.” The most recent reauthorization of the ESEA was through the Every Student Succeeds Act of 2015, which renamed Title III to “Language Instruction for English Learners and Immigrant Students.”

== Effects on bilingual education ==
In 1980, President Jimmy Carter established the Department of Education, which allowed for the Bilingual Education campaign to expand bilingual education programs. In addition to President Carter's efforts, President Bill Clinton also showed his support through the Improving America's Schools Act of 1994, which dramatically increased funding for bilingual and immigrant education. In 1998, the Linguistic Society of America showed its support for the BEA arguing that bilingual education was a basic human right; it believed that children should be educated in order to maintain their native language and cultural identity while acquiring the English language.

In 2001, Texas authorized and encouraged school districts to adopt dual language immersion programs for elementary-aged students. It stipulated that instruction in each language should be split 50–50 in class. More recently The Civil Rights Project, a research center founded at Harvard University and located at University of California, Los Angeles since 2007, is calling on policymakers to develop a new vision for bilingual education. Gándara and Hopkins gather compelling evidence that shows English-only policies in the states that adopted these restrictions aren't working. The project proposes a new attitude that embraces bilingualism: “It is time that the U.S. join the rest of the developed world in viewing bilingualism as an asset, not a deficit,” argues Gary Orfield, co-director of the project.

The Esther Martinez Native American Languages Preservation Act of 2019 extended funding for the Native American Languages Grant Program (established under the Native American Programs Act of 1974) through 2024.

The biggest obstacle to the BEA and expansion of bilingual education programs is the English-only Movement. There is no official language in the U.S., although some states have declared English as their official language. Three states in particular, California, Arizona, and Massachusetts, have declared English as their official language. In 1998, California passed Proposition 227 with the help of sponsor, Ron Unz, essentially ending bilingual education programs in exchange for an English immersion model which values assimilation over multiculturalism. In 2000, Arizona passed the English for Children initiative backed, again, by Ron Unz which mirrored California's Proposition 227 in replacing bilingual education programs with English immersion ones.

There has been widespread debate whether bilingual education programs or English immersion models are the best route to helping students acquire English. The question of whether public education should encourage the development of the native tongue remains unanswered. Some point out that California's Proposition 227 is failing the students for simply failing to address both the linguistic and cultural struggles that students face; in 2004, the test results for California public school students showed the achievement gap for English learners widening and the test scores of English learners to be declining across grade levels. Scholar Stephen Krashen maintains that these three states who have taken the harshest anti-bilingual education policies have seen progress that is modest, at best. In a report to the United States Government, an Arizona study shows that English language learners can take up to 13 years to attain fluency—most school programs only offer 3 years of participation in English-immersion or bilingual programs, putting the effectiveness of these programs into question. In order to ease the worries and qualms that people had in the programs' effectiveness, the Obama administration had proposed the implementation of an evaluation system states would be required to use in order to judge the progress seen in English language learners in schools. This would potentially restore faith in the bilingual programs and hold schools more accountable to student achievement and progress. The question remains if states are properly equipped across the board to meet such high expectations.

== Landmark court cases ==
- 1972: Aspira of New York, Inc v. New York Board of Education
  - Court ruled in favor of Puerto Rican and other Hispanic students whose language and cultural needs weren't being addressed. This triggered an increased development of bilingual programs in New York public schools.
- 1973: Keyes v. Denver School District No. 1
  - Court ruled in favor of Keyes recognizing the right that Hispanic children had to go to desegregated schools and not be racially isolated. The ruling recognizes Latinos’ suffering from systemic educational inequities.
- 1974: Lau v. Nichols
  - Court ruled in favor of Lau which guarantees students the right to a “meaningful education” regardless of language. This ruling ensures that districts will provide students with the same curriculum via initiatives such as bilingual programs and ESL classes. It also increased district accountability—schools with high numbers of English language learners must submit reports to the federal government to show they're providing adequate support for these students.
- 1974: Serna v. Portales
  - Court ruled in favor of Serna that Portales Municipal Schools must provide a bilingual curriculum to accommodate the non-English speaking students. Texas also commits to employ bilingual personnel in schools.
- 1978: Rios v. Reed
  - Court ruled in favor of Rios that the Pastchogue-Medford School District's bilingual program offered to students was essentially an English-only course. The ruling states that these students were denied an equal education since they weren't instructed in Spanish extensively in elementary school.
- 1981: Castañeda v. Pickard
  - Court ruled in favor of Castañeda that the school was racially segregating the Hispanic children in classes and not providing adequate bilingual programs to help them overcome English-language barriers. The decision established a clear evaluation system to hold bilingual programs accountable for providing equal educational opportunities (programs based on educational theory, implemented effectively, and proven to be successful in overcoming language barriers).
- 2009: Horne v. Flores
  - Court ruled in favor of Horne that the state should have the right to determine the requirements of its English Language Learner programs. This holds schools less accountable for producing fluent English-speakers.

== Notable reauthorizations ==
- Clinton's Improving America's Schools Act of 1994
- Bush's No Child Left Behind Act of 2002
- Obama's Every Student Succeeds Act of 2015
- House Bill 610 https://www.congress.gov/bill/115th-congress/house-bill/610

== See also ==
- Social policy and Education policy
- Federal Impact Aid
- Little School of the 400
- Native Language Immersion Student Achievement Act
- School Improvement Grant
