= Bilingual Education Act =

Language education law of the United States

- Other short titles: Title VII of the Elementary and Secondary Education Amendments of 1967
- Long title: An Act to authorize grants to assist elementary and secondary schools in providing bilingual education, and for other purposes.
- Acronyms (colloquial): BEA
- Enacted by: the 89th United States Congress
- Effective: January 2, 1968

Citations
- Public law: Pub. L. 90–247
- Statutes at Large: 81 Stat. 816

Codification
- Acts amended: Elementary and Secondary Education Act
- Titles amended: Title 20 of the United States Code (Education)
- U.S.C. sections amended: 20 U.S.C. ch. 70

Legislative history
- Introduced in the House as H.R. 2514 by Rep. Ralph Yarborough (D‑TX) on March 30, 1967; Committee consideration by Education and the Workforce; Senate Labor and Public Welfare; Passed the House on October 3, 1967; Passed the Senate on December 15, 1967; Reported by the joint conference committee on December 19, 1967; agreed to by the House on December 19, 1967 (Agreed (voice vote)); Signed into law by President Lyndon B. Johnson on January 2, 1968

The Bilingual Education Act (BEA), also known as the Title VII of the Elementary and Secondary Education Amendments of 1967, was the first United States federal legislation that recognized the needs of limited English speaking ability (LESA) students. The BEA was introduced in 1967 by Texas senator Ralph Yarborough and was both approved by the 90th United States Congress and signed by President Lyndon B. Johnson on January 2, 1968. While some states, such as California and Texas, and numerous local school districts around the country already had policies and programs designed to meet the special educational needs of elementary and secondary school students not fluent in the English language, this act signaled that the federal government now also recognized the need for and value of bilingual education programs in U.S. public education. In 1969 there was a 50% drop out rate among Mexican American students who struggled to keep up with their English-speaking peers in school; Representative Tony Abril argued that the Bilingual Education Act would reduce this number. Passed on the heels of the Civil Rights Movement, its purpose was to provide school districts with federal funds, in the form of competitive grants, to establish innovative educational programs for students with limited English speaking ability.

== Cultural implications ==
The BEA was a significant piece of education legislation. Its passage signaled "a shift from the notion that students should be afforded equal educational opportunity to the idea that educational policy should work to equalize academic outcomes, even if such equity demanded providing different learning environments."

Additionally, it reflected changes in cultural perspectives towards diversity and immigration. The BEA was an important shift away from the late 1950s anticommunist sentiment where anything foreign was suspect, which had destroyed many earlier local and state attempts at bilingual education. Furthermore, it recognized that the federal government was responsible for educating immigrants to the US and opened doors for bilingual education projects on local, state, and federal levels.

Furthermore, this legislation, successfully enacted into law largely thanks to the efforts of Spanish speakers, has become an important part of the "polemic between assimilation and multiculturalism" and has strengthened the role that language education plays in our society. Because the BEA in its original form promoted celebrating linguistic and cultural differences and diversity in the U.S., it in many ways challenged assimilationist theories and the "melting pot" concept of the U.S. And yet, in its final form when passed, it did not mention the important link between language and culture, leaving the language vague. When the BEA was first introduced it mainly focused on helping students to learn English instead of encouraging students to learn Spanish and promoting language and cultural retention.

The act additionally opened up a larger need for teachers who could teach language and other content within a language besides English. This placed a strain on the teaching pool available in 1968 and even today there is a shortage of teachers for these highly specialized positions. Culturally, it was argued in this time period that by teaching in a certain language it also taught specific values instead of just a way of communication. According to the 2002 National Survey of Latinos from PEW Research Center, within the first generation of Spanish speaking immigrants the language proficiency is mostly either Spanish (62%) or bilingual (37%), while the second generation is more likely to be proficient in English.

Chicago has implemented programs that follow the Bilingual Act one of those being the Dual Language Education (DLE) as well the Spanish Dual Program that highlights both. The Spanish dual language program within Chicago fosters bilingualism and biliteracy. They promote cultural enrichment and community engagement, bridging language barriers and creating inclusive environments. These programs also contribute to improved academic achievement and address equity gaps, preparing students for success in a multilingual world.

== Implementation and funding ==
When Senator Yarborough introduced the bill to the Senate in 1967, he envisioned it as a way of addressing the "'poor performance in school and high dropout rates... and great psychological harm' caused by 'English-only policies, no Spanish-speaking rules, and cultural degradation'" that was evident in many schools at the time.

Although the passage of the act was a bipartisan effort on behalf of Republicans and Democrats, it underwent significant changes between 1967 and 1968. Many of these changes were in the wording and framing of the act, which ultimately did not recognize the importance of biculturalism or the benefit of bilingualism or even the link between language and culture. Rather, it framed students of LESA as a "problem" that needed to be fixed. In addition, unlike what Yarborough had conceived, it provided no funding for permanent programs regarding students of LESA, as many people feared promoting a sense of entitlement in students and families benefitting from the act.

The BEA provided school districts with federal funds, in the form of competitive grants, to establish innovative educational programs for students with limited English speaking ability. The grants that the act provided were given directly to school districts and were to be used to buy resources for educational programs, to train teachers and teachers' aides, to develop and distribute materials and to create meaningful parental involvement projects. Although the act did not require the use of bilingual instruction or the use of a student's native language, its aim was to encourage innovative programs designed to teach students English. The act also gave school districts the opportunity to provide bilingual education programs without violating segregation laws, but at this time, participation was voluntary. Program effectiveness was evaluated at the end of every year and successful programs were eligible to receive federal funding for up to five years.

Because the BEA funding was provided in the form of grants, most of the financial clout lay with local and state education agencies (LEAs and SEAs). However, the federal government limited the reach of these funds in a few significant ways. To begin with, from a simple framing standpoint, the original 1968 BEA did not include any mention of instruction in or maintenance of a student's native language, limiting the potential impact of the act.

From a financial perspective, the BEA was also limited. The only programs eligible for receiving funding were programs for children between the ages of 3 and 8. Because it was meant to redress the dropout issue, the act with this caveat on funding viewed high school students of LESA somewhat of a lost cause. In addition, the act did not fund any permanent programs for educating students of LESA, but only funding exploratory programs. As a result, it did not seek to truly address the burgeoning issue of how to educate students who were not English dominant. Lastly, the funds were at first reserved for communities whose average income was below the poverty line stated in the ESEA ($3,000 in 1968). This limitation on funding had the unfortunate side effect of framing the act as a somewhat of a handout to poor, Latino communities.

Due to many of these limitations and the vague wording of much of the BEA, funding was limited in the first three years to $85 million. By 1972, "only 100,391 students nationally, out of approximately 5,000,000 in need were enrolled in a Title VII-funded program."

== Amendments to the Bilingual Education Act ==
=== 1974 amendments ===
The Bilingual Education Act of 1968 was not specific and participation by school districts was voluntary. As a result, Civil rights activists argued that the rights of minority-language students were being violated under this act. In 1974, three amendments were made to the original act in an attempt to clarify the intent and design of programs designated for the education of LESA students. There were two significant events that impacted these changes: the Lau v. Nichols case and the Equal Educational Opportunities Act of 1974.

Lau v. Nichols was a class-action suit brought against the San Francisco Unified School District and alleged that due to their inability to speak English, there were 1,800 Chinese students who were being denied an equal education. In 1974, the Supreme Court overruled the ruling of the lower courts and determined that the same resources, teachers and curriculum did not imply that the education was equal for students who had a limited command of the English language. In the same year as the Supreme Court's ruling, the Equal Education Opportunity Act was passed. By citing instructional programs as the means through which language barriers were to be broken, it effectively extended the Lau ruling to all students and school districts. Furthermore, school districts were required to have special programs for LESA students regardless of federal or state funding.

The amendments in 1974 served to do the following:

- define "Bilingual Education Program" as one that provided instruction in English and in the native language of the student to allow the student to progress effectively through the educational system
- define the program's goal to prepare LESA students to participate effectively in the regular classroom as quickly as possible while simultaneously maintaining the native language and culture of the student
- create regional support centers of consultants and trainers to provide support to school systems
- stipulate capacity-building efforts by providing funds to school districts' efforts to expand curricula, staff and research for bilingual programs

Funding increased from $7.5 million in 1968 to $68 million and as a result, programs were able to impact 368,000 students.

=== 1978 amendments ===
In 1978, further amendments were made to extend the act and broaden the definition of eligible students. Specifically, these amendments served to do the following:

- emphasize the strictly transitional nature of native language instruction
- expand eligibility to students who are limited English proficient (LEP)
- permit enrollment of English-speaking students in bilingual programs

Funding increased from $68 million in 1974 to $135 million which was enough to provide funding for 565 school districts and for secondary programs including service centers, graduate school fellowships and training for undergraduate students interested in becoming bilingual educators.

=== 1984 amendments ===
In 1984, the Bilingual Education Act was further modified. The amendments enacted during this time served to:

- increase the flexibility in the implementation of programs for LEP students by providing school districts with more autonomy and independence in deciding how these students should be taught
- allow school districts to apply for funding for different, innovative programs that best met the needs of their students

Funding for these amendments was $139.4 million and there was a heavy emphasis placed on districts using the funding to build enough capacity to eventually be able to support LEP programs without federal government funding.

=== 1988 amendments ===
The BEA was amended again in 1988. The changes this year served to:

- increase funding to state education agencies
- expand funding for "special alternative" programs
- create fellowship programs for professional training

Funding for the 1988 amendments was $159 million, with regulations for how the money should be divided. Specifically, at least 60% should be spent developing programs and at least 25% of funds should be spent on training.

=== 1994 reauthorization ===
The Bilingual Education Act (BEA) reauthorization in 1994 maintained the same tenets as the original BEA, introduced new grant categories, set up preference to programs promoting bilingualism, and took into account indigenous languages. Overall, the premise of this addition was to introduce a more systemic reform.

- Priority given to bilingualism programs: Though the Bilingual Education Act legislation did not prescribe specific instructional practices, it did provide a guide to help language minority students. The 1994 reauthorization gave preference to grant applications that developed bilingual proficiency, which Local Education Agencies had the right to develop themselves based on the guidelines of the BEA.
- In the FY2000 691 Bilingual Education Instructional Service Grants were given out totaling just over $162 million. The largest grants in FY2000 were given to the state of California and New York at approximately $58 million and $22.5 million respectively.
- 1994 California Proposition 187 was introduced in order to prevent illegal immigrants from obtaining state provided health care, social services and public education. This was voted on by the public and became a law in November 1994. Citizens challenged the constitutionality of this proposition and in March 1998 it was ruled unconstitutional and was taken away. Though the law did not last, it impacted students who were ELL throughout the mid-to-late 1990s.

== Significant court decisions ==
- Meyer v. Nebraska was the first U.S. Supreme Court case that addressed American education of foreign-languages. This case did away with a Nebraska law that prevented public and private schools from offering instruction in any language but English. '"The protection of the [U.S.] Constitution extends to all, to those who speak other languages as well as to those born with English on the tongue," Supreme Court Justice James C. McReynolds wrote. The decision established the principle that parents have a constitutional right to direct the upbringing of their children, including their education.'.
- Lau v. Nichols was a case brought forward, in which Chinese-American students attending a public school in San Francisco alleged that the failure to provide bilingual instruction to all non-English speaking students violated their rights to education due to limited English comprehension. The case did not create a specific remedy, yet in conjunction with the Civil Rights Act of 1964, ruled in favor of the students, thus expanding the rights of students with limited English proficiency.
- Serna v. Portales was a case that dictated when a "substantial group" of students with limited English proficiency was present, bilingual education was required.
- Aspira v. N.Y. Board of Education required testing for students in English and their native language in order to understand if they should receive additional services and bilingual education.
- Keyes v. School District No. 1, Denver, Colorado stated that students should receive instruction in their native language and English until proficiency in English is achieved.
- Flores v. Arizona stated that Arizona must do more to fund instruction for ELL students. The Arizona courts rejected tenets of the NCLB law that changed the services provided to ELL students. This case was appealed to the U.S. Supreme Court.
- Castañeda v. Pickard in 1981 created a basis for pedagogically addressing Limited English Proficiency (LEP) students. It required that districts have a plan for addressing LEP students, that schools provide qualified staff to implement that plan, and that the district has developed an effective evaluation protocol for the program. Though this case did create a more structured plan pedagogically it did not require bilingual education programs to meet these same standards. "It required only that 'appropriate action to overcome language barriers' be taken through well implemented programs."

== The Bilingual Education Act and No Child Left Behind ==
No Child Left Behind (NCLB), passed in 2002, had a significant impact on bilingual education and the Bilingual Education Act in the United States due to its emphasis on high-stakes testing. As a result of NCLB and its emphasis on testing, the Bilingual Education Act was renamed the English Language Acquisition, Language Enhancement, and Academic Achievement Act.

The name change alone of BEA under NCLB is significant in that it signals a shift in the philosophical approach to bilingual education. Essentially, even though the act still leaves with state and local educators the ability to choose from instructional methods, "the statement of purpose and accountability requirements make clear that the primary objective is English acquisition."

Under NCLB, school success and failure is linked to performance on standardized tests. However, this measure subjects English Language Learners (ELLs) "to critical assessments without adequate preparation." The lack of preparation is due to the fact that NCLB caps funding for bilingual education programs at half of what it had been and does not require that any bilingual education programs undergo periodic evaluation, a measure required by the Casteñada v. Pickard court case. And yet, despite this lack of preparation, ELLs performance on standardized tests can jeopardize a school's access to funding. In essence, "This turns the question of whether or not a school receives a failing label into a question of how many ELLs attend." Because the impact of NCLB on ELLs has significant implications on ELLs and their communities' access to education, NCLB is in conflict with Title VI of the Civil Rights Act of 1964 in that it denies "access to a federally funded program based on their skin color or race." The changes in the BEA under NCLB created a grant program that attempted to enhance English language acquisition. The ruling placed ELL students in a similar classroom environment as their peers for whom English is not a second language. The law did not require schools to provide bilingual programs and placed them against the rigorous content standards put in place by State Education Agencies. When ELLs were tested with the same state assessments or the National Assessment for Educational Progress (NAEP), it was shown that compared to their fluently English-speaking peers the ELL students displayed larger deficits in both reading and math. The 2007 NAEP test, showed increased deficits in both math and reading following a surge of the ELL population in the United States. By 2005 the number of English-learners throughout the US had risen 57% over the prior decade to approximately 5.1 million students.

After NCLB was enacted it was shown that there were sufficient numbers of prospective teachers, yet there were insufficient numbers of these teachers entering certain fields. Among these specializations were science, math, foreign languages, special education and namely bilingual education. Several initiatives formed to specifically recruit teachers to these specialization fields and allowed for alternative certification paths. These teacher shortages continue to exist today and are seen to a greater extent in high-poverty districts.

The act and NCLB say that the accommodations that it provides should be interpreted in concordance with federal civil rights laws. "As interpreted by the U.S. Supreme Court, Congress, and federal civil rights officials, these provisions rely on terms like “affirmative steps” and “appropriate action” that give school districts the discretion to use a range of instructional approaches. As a result, under both Title VI and the EEOA, courts and federal enforcement agencies must decide on a case-by-case basis whether programs are in fact overcoming linguistic barriers to full participation." The policy still remains highly-debated at both the state and federal level.

== See also ==
- Bilingual education
- Intercultural bilingual education
- Little School of the 400
- Equal Educational Opportunities Act of 1974
- No Child Left Behind Act
