= Nommo (disambiguation) =

The Nommo are ancestral spirits revered by the Dogon people of Mali.

Nommo may also refer to:

- Nommo (magazine), an American magazine
- The Nommo Award, a literary award for speculative fiction by Africans
- Nommo Gallery, an art gallery in Kampala, Uganda managed by the Uganda National Cultural Centre
- A race/species in the Master of Orion III game universe.
- A jazz composition by Jymie Merritt
