= Limited English proficiency =

Term for a person who is not fluent in English

Limited English proficiency (LEP) is a term used in the United States that refers to a person who is not fluent in the English language, often because it is not their native language. Both LEP and English-language learner (ELL) are terms used by the Office for Civil Rights, a sub-agency of the U.S. Department of Education.

According to data collected from the U.S. Census Bureau and Census Bureau American Community Survey (ACS) data, LEP individuals accounted for 9% of the U.S. population over the age of five.

The definition of "limited English proficiency" varies between states and within state districts.

== History ==
The term "limited English proficiency"—together with the initialism "LEP"—was first used in 1975 following the U.S. Supreme Court decision Lau v. Nichols. ELL (English Language Learner), used by United States governments and school systems, was created by James Crawford of the Institute for Language and Education Policy in an effort to label learners positively, rather than ascribing a deficiency to them. Recently, some educators have shortened this to EL – English Learner. The term English Learner replaced the term limited English proficient student with the 2015 re-authorization of the Elementary and Secondary Education Act by the Every Student Succeeds Act.

On August 11, 2000, President Bill Clinton signed Executive Order 13166, "Improving Access to Services for Persons with Limited English Proficiency." The Executive Order requires Federal agencies to examine the services they provide, identify any need for services to those with limited English proficiency, and develop and implement a system to provide those services so LEP persons can have meaningful access to them.

The Virginia Department of Education has created a guidebook titled, Limited English Proficient Students: Guidelines for Participation in the Virginia Assessment Program. The guidebook is intended to determine how Limited English Proficient (LEP) students should participate in the Standards of Learning testing.

On October 6, 2011, New York Governor Andrew Cuomo issued Executive Order 26, "Statewide Language Access Policy," requiring all "vital documents, including essential public documents such as forms and instructions provided to or completed by program beneficiaries or participates, be translated in the six most common non-English languages spoken by individuals with limited-English proficiency" across the state, based on U.S. Census data. The New York State Division of Human Rights identifies those six languages as Spanish, Chinese, Russian, Haitian Creole, Bengali and Korean.

In February 2017, New York City Council passed Local Law No. 30 to expand language access to the 10 most spoken languages other than English, according to averages of five-year U.S. Census data. The languages designated are Spanish, Chinese, Russian, Bengali, Haitian, Korean, Arabic, Urdu, French and Polish.

== Healthcare consequences ==
Limited English proficiency is associated with poorer health outcomes among Latinos, Asian Americans, and other ethnic minorities in the United States. Studies have found that women with LEP disproportionately fail to follow up on abnormal mammogram results, which may lead to increases in delayed diagnosis. Additionally, children in LEP families experience poor health outcomes due to reduced access to quality and safe medical care. Children in LEP families are less likely to have a primary care doctor and experience issues with medication administration, as well as dissatisfaction with care due to bad communication between doctors and parents/caregivers. Children in LEP families are three times as likely to have poor health status compared to children with parents who have English proficiency. It should also be noted that medical staff not understanding a family’s culture in addition to being LEP, children are four times as likely to not be brought in for needed care.

Results from a 2019 systematic review of the literature found that patients with limited English proficiency who received care from physicians fluent in the patients' preferred language generally had improved outcomes. These included both patient satisfaction and more objective measures.

=== Medical interpreter ===
A physician assistant with the Utah State Medical Command, Utah Army National Guard, speaks to an interpreter while working at a humanitarian civic assistance.

Less than half of non-English speakers who say they need an interpreter during clinical visits report having one. The absence of interpreters during a clinical visit adds to the communication barrier. Furthermore, inability of providers to communicate with limited English proficient patients leads to more diagnostic procedures, more invasive procedures, and over prescribing of medications. Many health-related settings provide interpreter services for their limited English proficient patients. This has been helpful when providers do not speak the same language as the patient. However, there is mounting evidence that patients need to communicate with a language concordant physician (not simply an interpreter) to receive the best medical care, bond with the physician, and be satisfied with the care experience. Having patient-physician language discordant pairs (i.e. Spanish-speaking patient with an English-speaking physician) may also lead to greater medical expenditures and thus higher costs to the organization. Additional communication problems result from a decrease or lack of cultural competence by providers. It is important for providers to be cognizant of patients' health beliefs and practices without being judgmental or reacting. Understanding patients' view of health and disease is important for diagnosis and treatment. So providers need to assess patients' health beliefs and practices to improve quality of care.

=== Asian Americans ===
One-third of the total population of Asian Americans is of limited English proficiency. Many Asian Americans are uncomfortable with communicating with their physician, leading to a gap in healthcare access and reporting. Even persons comfortable with using English may have trouble identifying or describing different symptoms, medications, or diseases. Cultural barriers prevent proper health care access. Many Asian Americans only visit the doctor if there are visible symptoms. In other words, preventive care is not a cultural norm. Also, Asian Americans were more likely than white respondents to say that their doctor did not understand their background and values. White respondents were more likely to agree that doctors listened to everything they had to say, compared with Asian American patients. Lastly, many beliefs bar access to proper medical care. For example, many believe that blood is not replenished, and are therefore reluctant to have their blood drawn.

== Education consequences ==
- Oakland Ebonics controversy

== See also ==
- English as a second or foreign language
- Language proficiency
- Bilingual Education Act
