= Alan Nichols =

American attorney (born 1930)

Alan Hammond Nichols
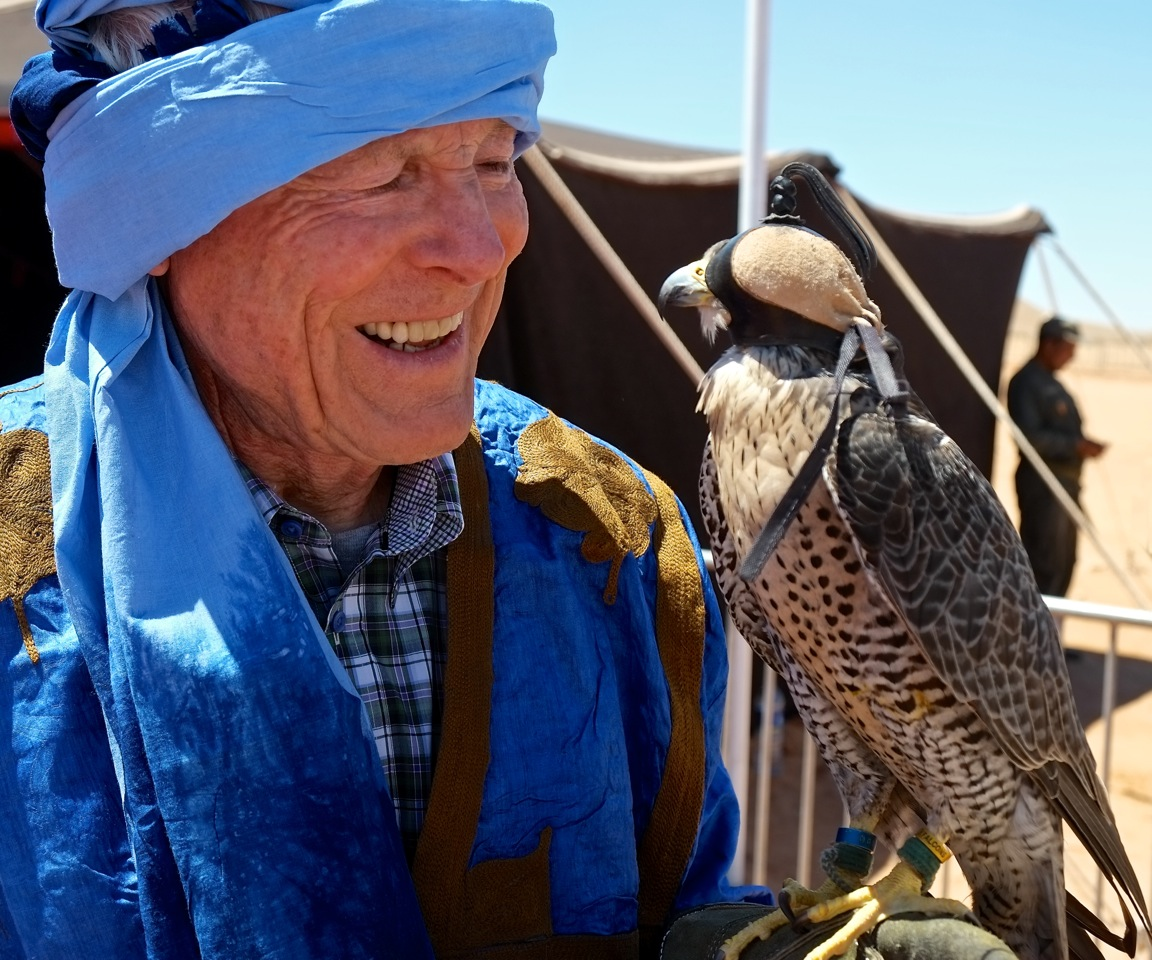
- Alan Nichols learning the art of falconry. Tan-Tan, Morocco, 2014.
- Born: February 14, 1930 (age 96); Palo Alto, California, U.S.
- Other name: Alan Hammond
- Education: Stanford University (BA); Stanford Law School (JD)
- Known for: Bicycling the Silk Road
- Scientific career
- Fields: Law, Exploration; Sacred mountains
- Workplaces: The Explorers Club

Alan Hammond Nichols (born February 14, 1930) is an American attorney, author, explorer and authority on sacred mountains. He was the 42nd president of The Explorers Club.

== Life ==
Nichols was educated at Stanford University receiving a BA and election to Phi Beta Kappa in 1951.

From 1951 to 1954, he saw active service in Korea with the 47th Infantry Division of the U.S. Army, mustering out as a lieutenant with a commendation medal with four clusters.

Back to civilian life, Nichols returned to Stanford to study law getting his JD in 1955. As a first-year law student he was selected for the Board of Editors of the Stanford Law Review.

After passing the bar, Nichols practiced law in the San Francisco area for over 50 years specializing in business, banking, finance, and non-profit companies. During this time he was actively involved in the governance of community organizations most notably the San Francisco Unified School District (SFUSD), City College of San Francisco, Prescott College, Cathedral (Elementary) School, Webb (High) School, the graduate school of California College, and the Ewald Foundation. During his tenure as president of SFUSD he was named respondent in the landmark 1974 civil rights case Lau v. Nichols, where the Supreme Court found for the students.

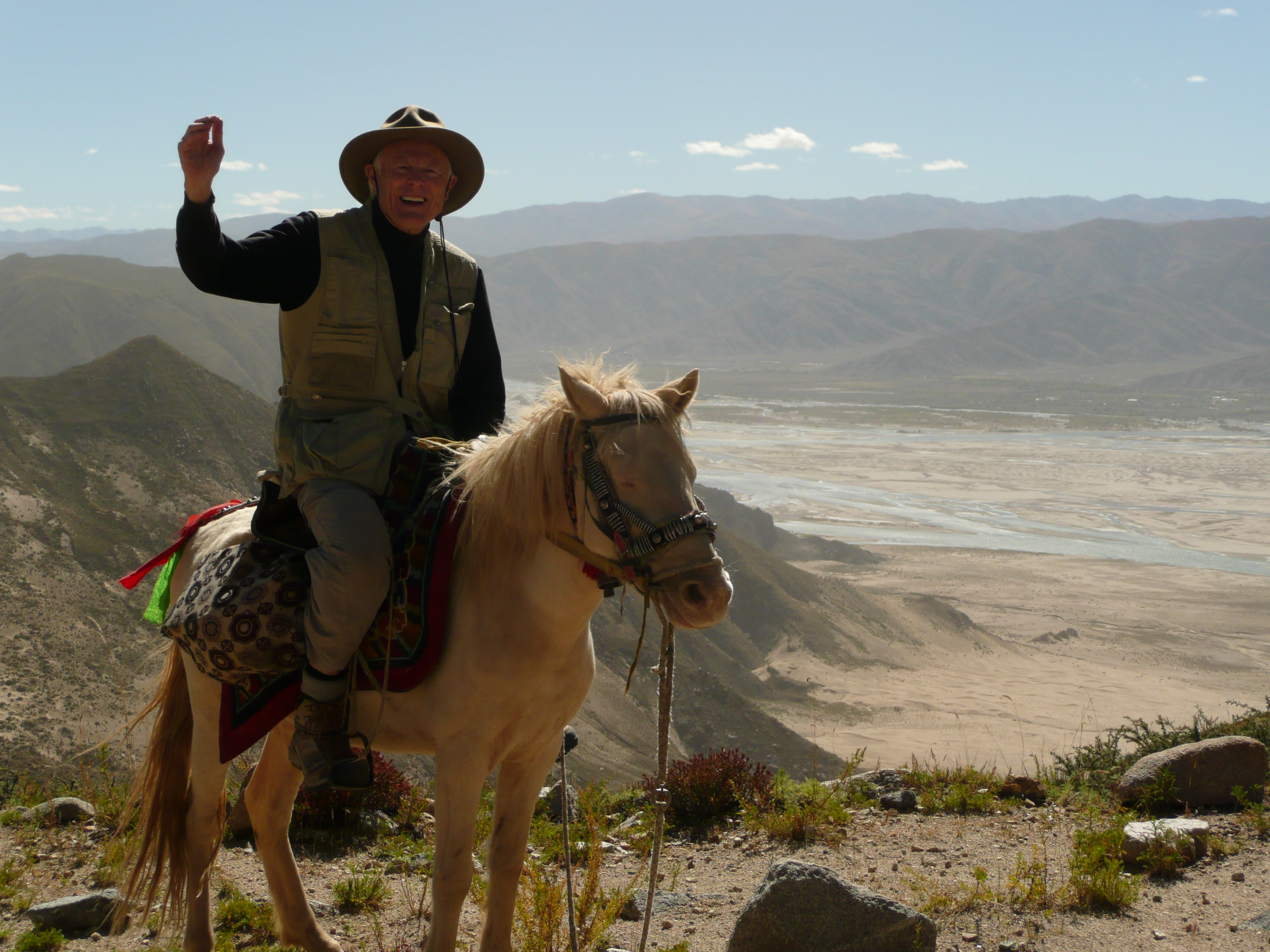
On the Khenzimane Path near Lhasa, Tibet in 2008, part of the escape route taken by the Dalai Lama in 1959.

Nichols has been active in campaigning and fund raising for the Republican party in his home state of California. In 1990, he ran unsuccessfully for Congress from the 5th District of California against Democrat Nancy Pelosi.

Throughout his life his interest in spirituality, religion and culture have inspired Nichols to travel the world and in doing so to attain many notable firsts. Among these, in 1978 when China opened the Tibet Autonomous Region for tourism he was the first Westerner to have permission to make pilgrimages to the sacred Tibetan sites of Mount Kailash and Lake Manasarovar. He has bicycled the entire 10,300 miles of the Silk Road from Istanbul to Xi’an, a journey completed in four legs beginning in 1989 and concluding in 2005. In 2010 and 2012 he was the first to lead expeditions into little traveled areas of Ningxia, Inner Mongolia and China in search of the tomb of the great Mongol emperor Genghis Khan.

Nichols holds an honorary doctor of science degree from California College of Podiatric Medicine.

He resides in Marin County, California, with his wife Rebecca "Becky" Rygh-Nichols.

== Selected publications ==
Nichols' written works include:

Non-fiction

- Nichols, Alan H. & Rogers, Harold E. (1965). Water for California: Planning, Law & Practice, Finance. San Francisco: Bancroft-Whitney. HathiTrust Digital Library. ASIN B0006BPZ1M.
- Nichols, Alan (1988, March) "The Xinjiang-Tibet Mountain Bike Expedition." The Explorers Journal. Volume 66, Number 1.
- Nichols, Alan H., Nichols, Nancy A. editor (1991). Journey: A Bicycle Odyssey through Central Asia. San Francisco: J.D. Huff & Company. ISBN 978-0963027443.
- Nichols, Alan H., Nichols, Nancy A., editor (1992). Letters Home from the Lafayette Flying Corps. San Francisco: J.D. Huff & Company. ISBN 978-0963027405
- Nichols, Alan H. (2002). Travels with Annie. Sacred Mountain Press. ISBN 978-0972663908
- Nichols, Alan H., editor (2003). Curriculum Guide for the Arts. The Ewald Foundation. Downloadable Version
- Nichols, Alan H. (2003/4, Winter). "Cycling the Silk Road: A Central Asian Adventure." The Explorers Journal. Volume 84, Number 4.

Under pen name

- Hammond, Alan (1978). A Gift from the Master. Las Vegas, NV: Illuminated Way Press. ISBN 978-0914766377.
- Hammond, Alan (1979). To Climb a Sacred Mountain: One Man's Search for God Atop the Holy Mountains of the World. Las Vegas, NV: Illuminated Way Press. ISBN 978-0914766476

As contributor

- Fok, Pat & Terrill, Ross (1974). Faces of China: Tomorrow, Today, Yesterday. Great Britain: Michael Joseph Limited. Contribution: Text on sacred mountains. ISBN 978-0718112769
- Nichols, Nancy Ann (1991). San Quentin: Inside the Walls. San Francisco: San Quentin Museum Association. Contribution: Pictures, stories and history. ISBN 978-0963011527

Fiction

- Nichols, Alan (2000). Adventures in Time (Poems from the 20th Century). Belvedere, CA: The Rygh Corporation. (c) Alan Nichols.

Under pen name

- Hammond, Alan (1962). San Francisco Commuter. Poems. San Francisco: Pendragon Press.
- Hammond, Alan (2011). All's Fair in Love and Law: Small Town Tales of Life, Laughter and Litigation. Novel. United Kingdom: Orion Publishing. ISBN 978-1409131618
