= Little School of the 400 =

Education program

The Little School of the 400 was a program in Texas to teach Spanish-speaking children 400 English words before they entered kindergarten during the late 1950s.

== History ==
Spanish-speaking children in Texas were being discriminated against due to strong nationalist and racist sentiments. Because they had not grown up speaking English, they were labeled as ignorant and incapable of learning by the public school teachers, administrators, and systems across the state. This led to high drop out rates of Mexican Americans, many of whom did not further their education past the third grade. Felix Tijerina, then the national president of the League of United Latin American Citizens (LULAC), along with Tony Campos, David Adame, and Jacob Rodriguez, devised this program to help children better transition into the English-language environment of public schooling, and ultimately integrating in a segregated Texas. It was created in 1957 and piloted in Ganado, TX. The goal of the program was to teach 400 basic English words to help Spanish-speaking children to manage instruction given in English in the regular public educational system and therefore help them achieve higher levels of schooling.

LULAC Council 60, of Houston, Texas, was in charge of the program.

The pedagogy of the "Little School" was used to model programs such as the Bilingual Education Act, Head Start, Texas Child Migrant Program, and Title I of the Elementary and Secondary Education Act.

A Texas Historical Marker now stands at Ganado Elementary School commemorating the program of the LS400.

25th president - elected at the 1956 convention, at the 1957 convention, at the 1958 convention, and, at the 1959 convention held in San Antonio, Texas. Served four terms.

=== Financial supporter Felix Tijerina ===
Felix Tijerina, the son of a farm worker, found himself with the heavy responsibility of helping support his widowed mother and three sisters when he was barely nine years old. He toiled in the cotton fields and had no opportunity to attend school. As the hard years went by, he finally moved to Houston, got a job as a dishwasher, taught himself English, married, and established his own restaurant. He was very successful and eventually became the owner of three restaurants. Wealth brought him invitations to join civic organizations, including LULAC. Tijerina was a member of Houston LULAC Council #60. He held many positions within the council. He was the director of the Rotary Club, of a bank and of numerous enterprises. Never forgetting his own hardships as a boy who could speak English, Tijerina was the inspiration and financial backer of the Little School of the 400, the precursor of the Headstart Program.

== See also ==
- Spanish language in Texas
- Spanish language in the United States
