= Education Consolidation and Improvement Act =

The 1981 Education Consolidation and Improvement Act (ECIA) reauthorized the Elementary and Secondary Education Act (ESEA), significantly deregulating education in the United States and shifting a number of responsibilities back to the state level. As part of the Reagan administration’s Omnibus Reconciliation Act of 1981, this act curtailed federal intervention and funding for domestic social causes while expanding the role of state and local government in administering education. This deregulation is symbolized by the reduced size of Title I, which was reduced from 75 pages to just 14.

According to the National School Boards Association, ECIA said little of classroom instruction and provided little incentives to experiment or innovate their practice. Part of the problem was that ECIA was passed very quickly and its development was based on little legislative history. By 1983, the influential A Nation at Risk report moved the debate around ECIA away from fiscal compliance and toward program excellence school improvement, and student achievement. The subsequent Hawkins-Stafford Elementary and Secondary School Improvement Act of 1988 had this missing emphasis, by formally encouraging “program improvement” from the states.

Federal funding for education was cut by over $1 billion. Title I, which was renamed Chapter I under ECIA, allocated $3.034 billion in FY 1982 from the federal government’s budget to support education. Most of these funds were distributed via formula grants to local education agencies; state educational agencies only received a small amount of funding. Chapter II funds amounted to $456 million in FY 1982 and were paid out to state education agencies depending on their school-age populations. 80 percent of Chapter II funds were then distributed to local educational agencies on the basis of three major areas: basic skills development, educational improvement and support services, and special projects. The remaining 20 percent of Chapter II funds were allocated by the state to cover expenditures related to curriculum development, training, planning, technical assistance, administration, monitoring, and enforcement activities. Finally, Chapter III specified the Secretary of Education’s power to issue regulations.
