= Horne v. Flores =

- Supreme Court of the United States

Argued April 20, 2009 Decided June 25, 2009
- Full case name: Thomas C. Horne, Superintendent, Arizona Public Instruction v. Miriam Flores et al.
- Docket nos.: 08-289; 08-294
- Citations: 557 U.S. 433 (more) 129 S. Ct. 2579

Holding
- The lower court's interpretation of the Rule 60(b)(5) standard was too strict. Courts should examine four factual and legal areas that may warrant relief for the state: 1) the impact of a new ELL learning program, 2) the impact of No Child Left Behind, 3) the impact of structural and managerial changes in its school system, and 4) the impact of an increased state general education fund.

Court membership
- Chief Justice John Roberts Associate Justices John P. Stevens · Antonin Scalia; Anthony Kennedy · David Souter; Clarence Thomas · Ruth Bader Ginsburg; Stephen Breyer · Samuel Alito

Case opinions
- Majority: Alito, joined by Roberts, Scalia, Kennedy, Thomas
- Dissent: Breyer, joined by Stevens, Souter, Ginsburg

Laws applied
- Equal Educational Opportunities Act of 1974

Horne v. Flores, 557 U.S. 433 (2009), is a case in which the United States Supreme Court remanded the case to determine whether Arizona's general education funding budget supports Equal Educational Opportunities Act of 1974 (EEOA)-compliant English Language Learner (ELL) programming.

== Background ==
The case was brought in 1992 by English Language Learner (ELL) students against the state board of education and state superintendent on the grounds that the Nogales Unified School District had failed to teach the students English, which was vital to their success. The case is styled after the plaintiff, Miriam Flores, one of the parents involved in the case, and the defendant, Thomas Horne, the Arizona Superintendent of Public Instruction.

In 2000, after almost eight years of pretrial proceedings and settling of various claims, the federal district court in Arizona held that the state was violating the Equal Educational Opportunity Act because the amount of funding it allocated for the special needs of ELL students was arbitrary and not related to the actual funding needed to cover the costs of ELL instruction in the plaintiffs' school district.

== Opinion of the Court ==
On June 25, 2009, the United States Supreme Court overturned the decision of the state court. It decided in favor of Horne, and allowing the state to determine its own requirements with regards to ELL instruction. Justice Alito wrote the opinion for the 5-4 majority. The opinion held that in evaluating the actions of the state attention should focus on student outcomes rather than on spending and inputs to schools.

== Dissent ==
Justice Breyer, joined by Justice Stevens, Justice Souter, and Justice Ginsburg. Justice Breyer argued that the lower courts did fairly consider every change in circumstances that the parties called to their attention, and that the majority opinion risks denying schoolchildren the English language instruction necessary to overcome language barriers that impede equal participation.

== See also ==
- List of United States Supreme Court cases, volume 557
- List of United States Supreme Court cases
