= Nommo (magazine) =

African-American political, cultural, and news magazine

Nommo is an African-American political, cultural, and news magazine. It is a quarterly student publication based at the University of California, Los Angeles. Founded by Lance Williams, Nommo published its first issue on December 4, 1968. It is " ... the nation’s oldest ethnic publication on a college campus." Editors have included Wanuri Kahiu, Lisa Smith-Young and M. K. Asante Jr.

The name "Nommo" means “power of the word” in Swahili. It also refers to the Dogon ancestral spirits the Nommo. A number of other magazines use the name Nommo as well, including ones published at Oberlin, (Georgia), Nashville, Saginaw, Heidelberg, and Paris.
