= Lau v. Nichols =

- Supreme Court of the United States

Argued December 10, 1973 Decided January 21, 1974
- Full case name: Lau, et al. v. Nichols, et al.
- Citations: 414 U.S. 563 (more) 94 S. Ct. 786; 39 L. Ed. 2d 1; 1974 U.S. LEXIS 151

Case history
- Prior: Certiorari to the United States Court of Appeals for the Ninth Circuit

Holding
- The failure of the San Francisco school system to provide English language instruction to approximately 1,800 students of Chinese ancestry who do not speak English violates § 601 of the Civil Rights Act of 1964.

Court membership
- Chief Justice Warren E. Burger Associate Justices William O. Douglas · William J. Brennan Jr. Potter Stewart · Byron White; Thurgood Marshall · Harry Blackmun; Lewis F. Powell Jr. · William Rehnquist

Case opinions
- Majority: Douglas, joined by Brennan, Marshall, Powell, Rehnquist
- Concurrence: Stewart, joined by Burger, Blackmun
- Concurrence: White
- Concurrence: Blackmun, joined by Burger

Laws applied
- Title VI of the Civil Rights Act of 1964

Lau v. Nichols, 414 U.S. 563 (1974), was a landmark United States Supreme Court case in which the Court unanimously decided that the lack of supplemental language instruction in public school for students with limited English proficiency violated the Civil Rights Act of 1964. The court held that since non-English speakers were denied a meaningful education, the disparate impact caused by the school policy violated Title VI of the Civil Rights Act of 1964 and the case was remanded to the District Court "for the fashioning of appropriate relief".

== Background ==
In 1971, the San Francisco school system desegregated based on the result of Supreme Court case Lee v. Johnson. At that time, 2,856 Chinese and Hispanic students, who were not fluent in English, were integrated back into the San Francisco Unified School District (SFUSD). Only about 1000 of those students were provided supplemental English instruction. Of the other 1800-plus Chinese students who were not fluent in English, many were placed in special education classes while some were forced to be in the same grade for years.

Even though the Bilingual Education Act was passed by Congress in 1968 to address the needs of Limited English Speaking Abilities students, its application was limited. School participation in those programs was also voluntary, and, by 1972, "only 100,391 students nationally, out of approximately 5,000,000 in need were enrolled in a Title VII-funded program."

Edward H. Steinman, a public-interest lawyer, became interested in the issue when Lucinda Lee Katz, a National Teacher Corp intern serving as a teacher of Kinney Law in a Chinatown elementary school, suggested the question be brought before a court in conversation with her then boyfriend. He brought the idea to Ed Steinman, lead lawyer for the case. Steinman worked on the case for four years before bringing it before the Supreme Court. reached out to the parents of Kinney Kinmon Lau and other Chinese students with limited English proficiency. He encouraged them to challenge the school district, and they filed a class action suit against Alan H. Nichols, the president of the SFUSD at the time, and other officials in the school district. The students claimed that they were not receiving special help in school due to their inability to speak English, and they argued they were entitled to special help under the Fourteenth Amendment and the Civil Rights Act of 1964 because of equal protection and the ban on educational discrimination.

The District Court for the Northern District of California denied the relief and the Court of Appeals for the Ninth Circuit affirmed the decision. The District Court argued that since a uniform policy was used for all students in SFUSD and that the district didn't intentionally discriminate against students with limited English proficiency, equal protection was provided and the Fourteenth Amendment was not violated. The Court of Appeals claimed that since the school district provided the same treatment for all students, even though some students were disadvantaged due to their limited fluency in English, the school district was not required to make up for the different starting points of students. The students appealed the Court of Appeal's decision to the Supreme Court.

== Decision of the Supreme Court ==
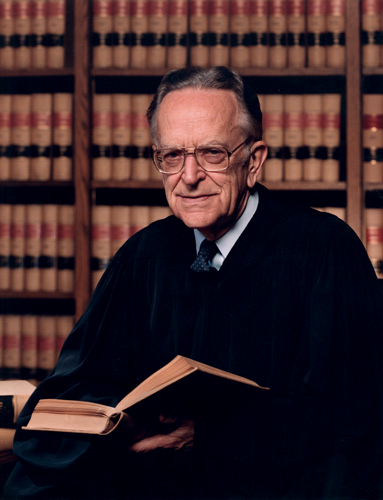
Justice Harry Blackmun, who concurred with the decision and stated that the number of students affected in this case was substantial enough to deem affirmative remedies necessary.

The Supreme Court issued its decision on January 21, 1974, with the Court unanimously ruling in favor of Lau. Instead of examining the equal protection clause from the 14th Amendment, the Court relied on Section 601 of the Civil Rights Act of 1964. Since the school system received federal funding, it was required to provide equal opportunities and access to all students. The Court claimed that even though the school districts provided equal treatment for all students, it still imposed disparate impact on the non-English speaking students since they were not able to understand the class material as effectively as other students and therefore were deprived of having "meaningful" education. The Court also referenced the guideline established by the Office for Civil Rights (OCR) of the Department of Health, Education and Welfare in 1970, which stated that language could be used as a proxy of discrimination on national origin and that "the district must take affirmative steps to rectify the language deficiency in order to open its instructional program to these students." The case was remanded to the District Court "for the fashioning of appropriate relief".

Justice Potter Stewart, joined by Chief Justice Burger and Justice Blackmun, concurred with this decision as he stated that affirmative remedial efforts, suggested by the OCR, were constitutional and appropriate in this case as long as the efforts were "reasonably related to the purposes of the enabling legislation." In his concurrence joined by Chief Justice Burger, Justice Blackmun also suggested that "numbers are at the heart of this case" and that if the case only involved a few students, rather than nearly 2,000, the decision would not be the same.

== Legacy ==
Lau remains an important decision in bilingual education history. In this case, the Supreme Court found a violation of the Civil Rights Act of 1964 based on the discriminatory effect of the school policy, regardless of the intent of the officials. It prohibited the "sink or swim" policy and set a precedent of finding disparate impact in violation of the Civil Rights Act. The decision was subsequently followed by the passing of Equal Educational Opportunities Act of 1974 in Congress, which specifically prohibited discrimination against faculty and students in public schools and required the school districts to take "appropriate action" to overcome the barriers to equal participation of all students. It increased funding to the Bilingual Education Act and made additional English instruction mandatory, which effectively extended the Lau ruling to all public schools. The Office for Civil Rights then developed a remedial guideline in 1975, otherwise known as the Lau Remedies, that specified methods and approaches for school districts to follow in order to provide a meaningful education to students with limited English proficiency. This led to the development of bilingual programs and additional English instruction in most public schools.

However, there have been challenges to the Lau decision in recent decades. In the Supreme Court case Alexander v. Sandoval, 532 U.S. 275 (2001), the Court claimed that private plaintiffs did not have the right of action to sue against disparate impact violation under Title VI and they must provide proof of intentional discrimination. It implied that students can no longer sue schools for policies that cause disparate impact, which significantly weakened the foundation of the Lau decision.

== See also ==
- List of United States Supreme Court cases, volume 414
- Bilingual education
- Bilingual Education Act
- Castañeda v. Pickard
