= Equal Educational Opportunities Act of 1974 =

Civil rights law of the United States

- Long title: An act to establish a comprehensive prohibition of discrimination on the basis of race, color, gender, or national origin
- Acronyms (colloquial): EEOA
- Effective: August 21, 1974

Citations
- Statutes at Large: 88 Stat. 514

Codification
- Acts amended: Elementary and Secondary Education Act
- Titles amended: 20 U.S.C.: Education
- U.S.C. sections amended: 20 U.S.C. ch. 1701 et seq.

Legislative history
- Signed into law by President Richard Nixon on 1974

United States Supreme Court cases
- Lau v. Nichols Castañeda v. Pickard Plyler v. Doe Keyes v. School District 1 United States v. State of Texas Idaho Migrant Council v. Board of Education; Horne v. Flores, 557 U.S. 433 (2009)

The Equal Educational Opportunities Act (EEOA) of 1974 is a federal law of the United States of America. It prohibits discrimination against faculty, staff, and students, including racial segregation of students, and requires school districts to take action to overcome barriers to students' equal participation. It is one of a number of laws affecting educational institutions including the Rehabilitation Act (1973), Individuals with Disabilities Education Act (IDEA) and the Americans with Disabilities Act (ADA).

== Background ==
=== Origins ===
The civil rights movement brought about controversies on busing, language rights, desegregation, and the idea of “equal education". The groundwork for the creation of the Equal Educational Opportunities Act first came about with the passage of the Civil Rights Act of 1964, which banned discrimination and racial segregation against African Americans and women. In 1968 the U.S. Department of Education, formerly the Department of Health, Education, and Welfare, issued a statement saying that school officials are responsible for providing equal educational opportunities for all, regardless of one’s nationality, race, or color. A 1970 memorandum was then passed, clarifying the responsibilities of school officials. In addition to requiring separate classes to be created for students less than proficient in the English language, communication between students’ parents and the school was to be required to be conducted in a language understood by the parents.

=== President Nixon's proposals ===
On March 6, 1972, President Richard Nixon clarified the definition of “equal educational opportunity” and also called for the judiciary to create a more uniform set of standards off which to judge future cases related with educational opportunity, prioritize equal education, and create alternatives to busing. He set forth two specific proposals on this day: one to effectively eliminate busing entitled "The Student Transportation Moratorium Act" and another entitled the Equal Educational Opportunities Act.

Although the Equal Educational Opportunities Act was not passed at that time, Nixon declared that “[t]his act would require that every State or locality grant equal educational opportunity to every person, regardless of race, color, or national origin”. In the 1974 Lau v. Nichols, students unable to speak English fluently were denied additional education, resulting in renewed interest in Nixon’s 1972 proposals. This led to the official passage of the act on August 21, 1974.

=== Legislative history ===
Congress passed the EEOA as a house bill amending the Elementary and Secondary Education Act of 1965. The only legislative history available for reference is from a similar bill passed in 1972. The House Committee on Education and Labor noted that the bill was significant in that it contained the first "illustrative definition of a denial of equal educational opportunity", and that this lent clarity to schools, governmental authorities, and students as to what, precisely, their rights were.

== Contents of the act ==
=== Provisions ===
The act states that no U.S. state can deny equal educational opportunity to any person on the basis of gender, race, color, or nationality through intentional segregation by an educational institution; neglecting to resolve intentional segregation; by forced assignment of a student to a school, other than the one closest to their place of residence, that promotes further segregation; by discrimination in determining faculty and staff; by purposely transferring a student to another school to increase segregation; or by failing to remove language barriers preventing students from being able to equally participating in English classes.

The act also states that lawsuits may also be filed should individuals believe themselves to be denied equal education from their peers. The U.S. attorney general is also allowed to initiate civil action on behalf of students should he deem it necessary.

=== Defining "Appropriate Action" ===
The act remains vague in its statutory language. The EEOA states that no state can deny students the right to equal education by "failure by an educational agency to take 'appropriate action' to overcome language barriers that impede equal participation by its students in its instructional programs". For example, although the act bears no mention of bilingual education, but instead uses the term "appropriate action" to describe measures Congress may take to enforce the EEOA, Congress has interpreted bilingual education as an action a school district must take to help teach non-English-speaking students how to speak English.

== Notable court cases ==
=== Lau v. Nichols (1974) ===
This case was a landmark case during which the U.S Supreme Court made one of its first interpretations of the term "appropriate action". In 1974 the court ruled that a school district based in San Francisco had violated the Civil Rights Act of 1964 by denying students of Chinese descent opportunities to participate in classes. The court decided that just providing the students with the same textbooks, desks, and teachers was not sufficient, and measures, such as instruction in both Chinese and English, needed to be taken to make sure that English was taught to non-English speaking students.

=== Castañeda v. Pickard (1981) ===
In 1981 the U.S Fifth Circuit of Appeals created a three-prong test to be used to determine whether or not school officials denied students not proficient in English the right to enjoy equal educational opportunities. Under this test, an acceptable program for English-language learners is as follows:

- A curriculum is recognized by experts in the field;
- The programs or methods used are effective in carrying out the curriculum;
- The program proves successful in helping to overcome language barriers.

The court ruled that students learning English as their second language should be able to receive the rest of the school’s educational opportunities regardless of any language barriers.

=== Plyler v. Doe (1982) ===
In 1982 the court ruled that public school districts could not deny immigrant students from receiving a free public education. The court also ruled that not only do undocumented children have the right to receive the same public education, but that they are also required, like U.S. citizens and permanent residents, to attend school until they are of age as laid down by the state law.

Public schools and school personnel are also not allowed to adopt measures that would prevent students from receiving access to public education based on their citizenship status. For example, the court ruled that school officials cannot legally ask students to present proof of citizenship such as green cards. Instead, they can only ask the student to provide proof that they reside within the boundaries of the school district.

=== Keyes v. School District 1 (1983) ===
In 1983 the three-part test created in the Castañeda v. Pickard was used to decide that a school district in Denver, Colorado, had participated in intentionally separating white students from Mexican-American students. The court ordered for desegregation.

=== United States v. State of Texas (1982) ===
In 1982 the Court ruled that the state of Texas had failed to provide opportunities for English learners, mainly of Latino descent, to overcome language barriers under the EEOA. State education agencies adopted bilingual services to be provided for those learning how to speak English.

=== Idaho Migrant Council v. Board of Education (1981) ===
In 1981 the U.S. Ninth Circuit ruled that state education departments needed to enforce federal mandates in local school districts.

=== Flores v. Arizona (2000) ===
This case was first filed in 1992 from parents accusing schools for failing to provide adequate enough educational services for English language learners and in 2000, the court ruled that educational programs were not properly funded nor were enough teachers provided. As a result, the court ruled for sufficient educational resources to be implemented as of January 31, 2002, and in 2009, the Court ruled that the EEOA was officially violated.

== See also ==
- Civil Rights Act of 1964
- Equal Opportunity Employment
- United States Department of Education
