= Castañeda v. Pickard =

1981 court case regarding language education in the United States

- Court: United States Court of Appeals for the Fifth Circuit
- Full case name: Elizabeth and Katherine Castañeda, by their father and next friend, Roy C. Castañeda, et al v. Mrs. A. M. "Billy" Pickard, President, Raymondville Independent School District, Board of Trustees, et al
- Decided: June 23, 1981
- Citation: 648 F.2d 989 (5th Cir. 1981)

Case history
- Subsequent history: 781 F.2d 456 (5th Cir. 1986)

Court membership
- Judges sitting: Homer Thornberry, Randall, Albert Tate Jr.

Case opinions
- Majority: Randall

Laws applied
- Equal Educational Opportunities Act of 1974

The case of Castañeda v. Pickard was tried in the United States District Court for the Southern District of Texas in 1978. This case was filed against the Raymondville Independent School District (RISD) in Texas by Roy Castañeda, the father of two Mexican-American children. Castañeda claimed that the RISD was discriminating against his children because of their ethnicity. He argued that the classroom his children were being taught in was segregated, using a grouping system for classrooms based on criteria that were both ethnically and racially discriminating.

Castañeda also claimed the Raymondville Independent School District failed to establish sufficient bilingual education programs, which would have aided his children in overcoming the language barriers that prevented them from participating equally in the classroom.

According to Lau v. Nichols, 414 U.S. 563 (1974), a case decided by the U.S. Supreme Court, school districts in this country are required to take the necessary actions in order to provide students who do not speak English as their first language the ability to overcome the educational barriers associated with not being able to properly comprehend what is being taught to them. Castañeda argued that there was no way to sufficiently measure the Raymondville Independent School District's approach to overcoming this barrier.

The Castañeda v. Pickard case was tried; on August 17, 1978, the court system ultimately ruled in favor of the Raymondville Independent School District, stating they had not violated any of the Castañeda children's constitutional or statutory rights. As a result of the District Court ruling, Castañeda filed for an appeal, arguing that the District Court made a mistake in its ruling.

In 1981, the United States Court of Appeals for the Fifth Circuit ruled in favor of the Castañedas; as a result, the court decision established a three-part assessment for determining how bilingual education programs would be held responsible for meeting the requirements of the Equal Educational Opportunities Act of 1974. The criteria are listed below:

- The bilingual education program must be “based on sound educational theory.”
- The program must be “implemented effectively with resources for personnel, instructional materials, and space.”
- After a trial period, the program must be proven effective in overcoming language barriers/handicaps.

== Bibliography ==
1. Mora, Jill Kerper, "Legal History of Bilingual Education." San Diego State University. 26 January 2005. San Diego State University. 12 February 2007. <https://web.archive.org/web/20070203130033/http://coe.sdsu.edu/people/jmora/Pages/HistoryBE.htm>.
2. Larsen, Ann. "Office of Educational Services and Support." South Dakota Department of Education. 2004. SD Dept. of Education. 12 February 2007. <https://web.archive.org/web/20070212003908/http://doe.sd.gov/oess/title/IIIela/rationale.asp>.
3. Hakuta, Kenji, "Castañeda vs. Pickard (1981) " LAU - A resource for students, teachers, researchers, and policymakers. Stanford University School of Education. 12 February 2007. #
4. Temple, Charles et al. (2005). “Bilingual Education.” All Children Read: Teaching for Literacy in Today’s Diverse Classrooms. Pearson/Merrill/Prentice Hall Publishers. Page 54.
