= Every Student Succeeds Act =

2015 United States education reform law

- Long title: An original bill to reauthorize the Elementary and Secondary Education Act of 1965 to ensure that every child achieves.
- Acronyms (colloquial): ESSA
- Enacted by: the 114th United States Congress

Citations
- Public law: Pub. L. 114–95 (text) (PDF)
- Statutes at Large: 129 Stat. 1802

Codification
- Acts amended: Elementary and Secondary Education Act
- Acts repealed: No Child Left Behind Act
- Titles amended: 20 U.S.C.: Education
- U.S.C. sections amended: 20 U.S.C. ch. 28 § 1001 et seq. 20 U.S.C. ch. 70

Legislative history
- Introduced in the Senate as S. 1177 by Lamar Alexander (R-TN) on April 30, 2015; Committee consideration by Senate Committee on Health, Education, Labor, and Pensions; Passed the House on December 2, 2015 (359–64); Passed the Senate on December 9, 2015 (85–12); Signed into law by President Barack Obama on December 10, 2015

The Every Student Succeeds Act (ESSA) is a US law passed in December 2015 that governs the United States K–12 public education policy. The law replaced its predecessor, the No Child Left Behind Act (NCLB), and modified but did not eliminate provisions relating to the periodic standardized tests given to students.

Like the No Child Left Behind Act, ESSA is a reauthorization of the Elementary and Secondary Education Act of 1965, which established the federal government's expanded role in public education. The Every Student Succeeds Act passed both chambers of Congress with bipartisan support.

== Overview ==
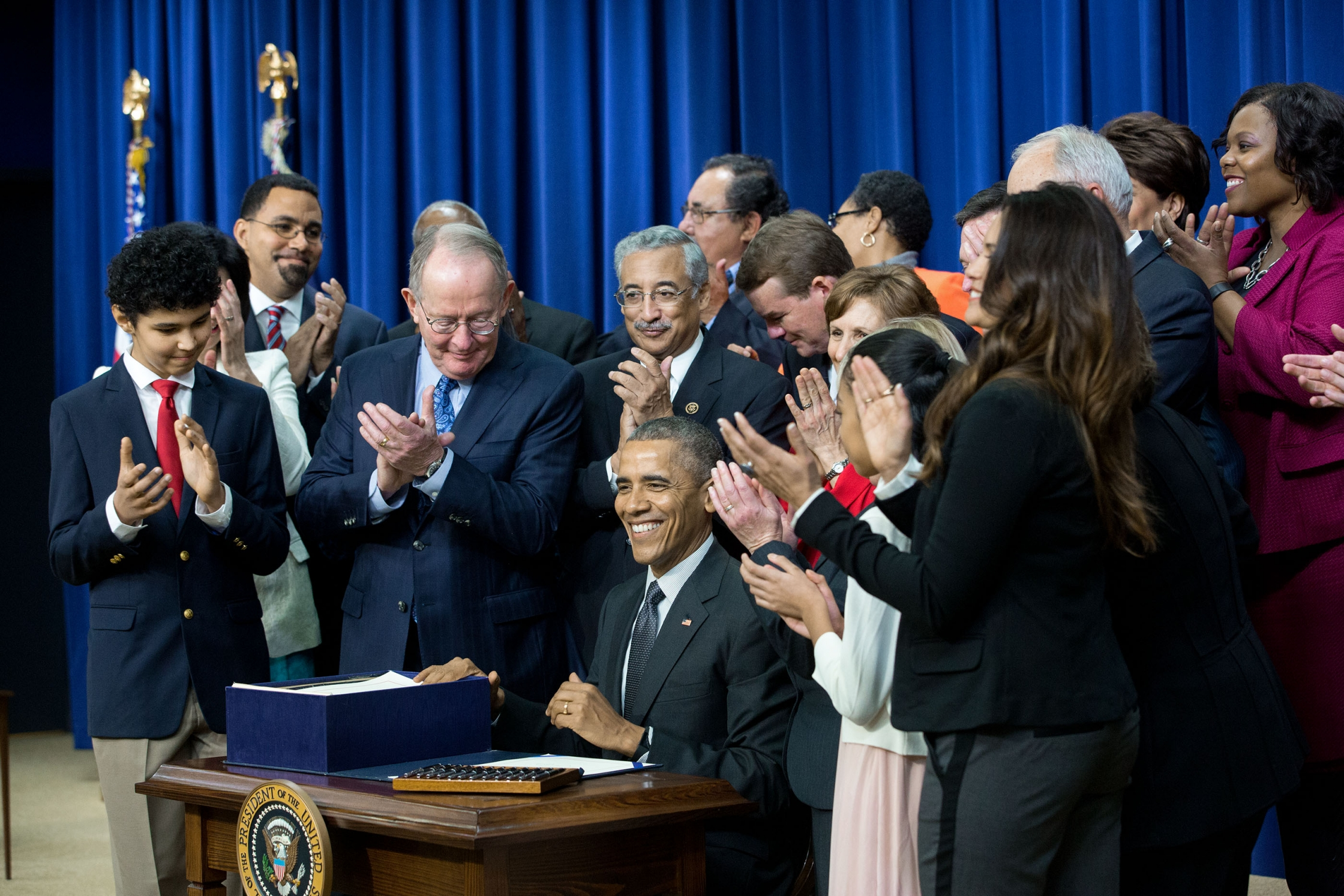
President Barack Obama signs the Act into law, December 2015.

The bill is the first to narrow the United States federal government's role in elementary and secondary education since the 1980s. The ESSA retains the hallmark annual standardized testing requirements of the 2001 No Child Left Behind Act but shifts the law's federal accountability provisions to states. Under the law, students will continue to take annual tests between the third and eighth grades.

The ESSA leaves significantly more control to the states and districts in determining the standards students are held to. States are required to submit their goals and standards and how they plan to achieve them to the U.S. Department of Education, which must then submit additional feedback, and eventually approve. In doing so, the Department of Education still holds states accountable by ensuring they are implementing complete and ambitious, yet feasible goals. Students will then be tested each year from third through eighth grade and then once again their junior year of high school. These standardized tests will determine each student's capabilities in the classroom, and the success of the state in implementing its plans. The states are also left to determine the consequences low-performing schools might face and how they will be supported in the following years. The Department of Education defines low-performing schools as those in the bottom ten percent of the state, based on the number of students who successfully graduate or the number of students who test proficient in reading or language arts and mathematics.

All states must have a multiple-measure accountability system, which include the following four indicators: achievement and/or growth on annual reading/language arts and math assessments; English language proficiency, an elementary and middle school academic measure of student growth; and high school graduation rates. All states also had to include at least one additional indicator of school quality or student success, commonly called the fifth indicator. Most states use chronic absenteeism as their fifth indicator.

Another primary goal of the ESSA is preparing all students, regardless of race, income, disability, ethnicity, or proficiency in English, for a successful college experience and fulfilling career. Therefore, the ESSA also requires schools to offer college and career counseling and advanced placement courses to all students.

== History ==
ESSA vote
Senate		House	
Rep.	Dem.	Rep.	Dem.
40–12	45–0	178–64	181–0

The No Child Left Behind Act was due for reauthorization in 2007, but was not pursued for a lack of bipartisan cooperation. Many states failed to meet the NCLB's standards, and the Obama administration granted waivers to many states for schools that showed success but failed under the NCLB standards. However, these waivers usually required schools to adopt academic standards such as the Common Core. The NCLB was generally praised for forcing schools and states to become more accountable for ensuring the education of poor and minority children. However, the increase in standardized testing that occurred during the presidencies of Bush and Obama met with resistance from many parents, and many called for a lessened role for the federal government in education. Similarly, the president of the National Education Association decried the NCLB's "one-size-fits-all model ... of test, blame and punish."

Following his 2014 re-election, Senate HELP Committee Chairman Lamar Alexander (R-TN), who had served as Education Secretary under President George H. W. Bush, decided to pursue a major rewrite of No Child Left Behind. Alexander and Patty Murray (D-WA), the ranking member of the HELP committee, collaborated to write a bipartisan bill that could pass the Republican-controlled Congress and earn the signature of President Barack Obama. At the same time, John Kline (R-MN), chairman of the House Committee on Education and the Workforce, pushed his own bill in the House. In July 2015, each chamber of the United States Congress passed their own renewals of the Elementary and Secondary Education Act. President Obama remained largely outside of the negotiations, though Alexander did win Obama's promise to not threaten to veto the bill during negotiations. As the House and Senate negotiated for the passage of a single bill in both houses, Bobby Scott (D-VA), the ranking member of the House Committee on Education and the Workforce, became a key player in ensuring Democratic votes in the House. By September 2015, the House and Senate had been able to resolve most of the major differences, but continued to differ on how to evaluate schools and how to respond to schools that perform poorly. House and Senate negotiators agreed to a proposal from Scott to allow the federal government to mandate specific circumstances in which states had to intervene in schools, while broadly giving states leeway in how to rate schools and in how to help struggling schools. Other major provisions included a pre-K program (at the urging of Murray), a provision to help ensure that states would not be able to exempt large swaths of students from testing (at the behest of civil rights groups), and restrictions on the power of the Education Secretary (at the urging of Alexander and Kline). The surprise resignation of Speaker John Boehner nearly derailed the bill, but incoming Speaker Paul Ryan's support of the bill helped ensure its passage. In December 2015, the House passed the bill in a 359–64 vote; days later, the Senate passed the bill in an 85–12 vote. President Obama signed the bill into law on December 10, 2015.

== Students with disabilities ==
The ESSA also sets new mandates on expectations and requirements for students with disabilities. Most students with disabilities will be required to take the same assessments and will be held to the same standards as other students. The ESSA allows for only one percent of students, accounting for ten percent of students with disabilities, to be excused from the usual standardized testing. This one percent is reserved for students with severe cognitive disabilities, who will be required to take an alternate assessment instead. This is a smaller percentage of students than under past mandates, mainly because there is not enough staff available to administer the assessments to the students one-on-one. The Department of Education does not define disabled, rather, each state decides its own definition in order to determine which students will be allowed to take the alternate assessment. This could prove to be more challenging, though, when it comes to comparing students to one another because not all states will define disabled the same way. The ESSA has also recognized that bullying and harassment in schools disproportionately affects students with disabilities. Because of this, the ESSA requires states to develop and implement plans on how they will combat and attempt to reduce bullying incidents on their campuses.

== Reception and opinion ==
President Obama explains why he signed the Act.

Journalist Libby Nelson wrote that the ESSA was a victory for conservatives who wished to see federal control of school accountability transferred to states, and that states "could scale back their efforts to improve schools for poor and minority children".

Researchers from the Thomas B. Fordham Institute approved of "grant[ing] states more authority over their accountability systems." However, they also expressed concern that, in an effort to set proficiency levels that low-performing students could pass, states would neglect the needs of high-performing students, which would disproportionately affect high-performing, low-income students.

=== Criticism ===
While the ESSA has received positive responses, it has also faced major critiques for various reasons. People argue that ESSA's focus on state-level control and accountability has resulted in inconsistencies in the quality of education, which ultimately emphasizes pre-existing inequities that existed under the policies that were replaced by the ESSA, which are the Elementary and Secondary Education Act and the No Child Left Behind Act. Other concerns that were raised were a shift in control which can result in further inconsistencies when it comes to enforcement which would possibly worsen current inequalities in regards to resource allocation for students who face various disadvantages. In addition to this, the ESSA has also been challenged for calling for an increase of out-of-field teaching, meaning teachers are being asked to instruct subjects outside of their specialization. Research also showed an increase in assignments after the ESSA was enforced, impacting low income students, students enrolled in special education, and students attending charter or remote institutions. The major shift from requiring qualified teachers to only guaranteeing equitable distribution of out-of-field teachers has played a role in poor academic performance and an increase in teacher turnover rates. The ESSA has also generated concern since it also reduced authority for the U.S. Department of Education and cut the budget for the development of educational leadership. These new concerns arose in regard to the USDE's ability to support state initiatives. Reducing the size of state education departments and retirement of highly trained staff have also raised questions on the states' ability to enforce the ESSA programs. Critics call for a more integrated method of approach to leadership and funding to reach the full potential of the ESSA to improve educational outcomes.

=== Praise ===
The ESSA has gained recognition for its advancement in educational equity and for promoting new strategies in regards to school improvements based on proven evidence. The ESSA has highlighted the importance of inclusive and culturally diverse leadership when it comes to improving the overall student achievement by requiring state funding for the development of leadership in underperforming schools. States who have demonstrated this, such as New Mexico or Tennessee, have utilized these funds to establish partnerships and leadership paths that achieve national expectations, ultimately improving educational outcomes. The ESSA has also led a shift in the direction towards evidence-based intervention in school improvement initiatives. By doing this, the ESSA has promoted more thoughtful decision-making and improved evaluation practices to guarantee the execution of proper education methods. By mandating complete needs evaluations and supporting interest groups involvement, the ESSA has made sure that improvement plans are constructed to fit the needs of the disadvantaged students and those from minority groups. This method strengthens equity in education and state's flexibility, leaving a national impact on the educational field.

== State testing under ESSA ==
According to the October 24, 2015 U.S. Department of Education Fact Sheet: Testing Action Plan, state testing programs implemented under the No Child Left Behind Act and Race to the Top were "draining creative approaches from our classrooms", "consuming too much instructional time" and "creating undue stress for educators and students."

Federal mandates and incentives were cited as partly responsible for students spending too much time taking standardized tests. The ESSA provided states with flexibility to correct the balance and unwind "practices that have burdened classroom time or not served students or educators well."

The Every Student Succeeds Act statute, regulations, and guidance give states broad discretion to design and implement assessment systems. Neither the statute nor the regulations apply any specific limits on test design, however United States Department of Education guidance documents say it is essential to ensure that tests "take up the minimum necessary time."

Section 1111(b)(2)(B)(viii)(1) of the ESSA presents states with the opportunity to meet all Federal academic assessment requirements with a single comprehensive test. As of 2018-19, some states like Maryland continue to fulfill ESSA assessment requirements by administering four or more content-specific state standardized tests with testing windows that stretch from December through June.

The ESSA prohibits any officer or employee of the Federal Government from using grants, contracts or other cooperative agreements to mandate, direct or control a state's academic standards and assessments. It also explicitly prohibited any requirement, direction or mandate to adopt the Common Core State Standards and gave states explicit permission to withdraw from the Common Core State Standards or otherwise revise their standards. On January 31, 2019, Florida's Governor signed an executive order "eliminating Common Core and the vestiges of Common Core" from Florida's public schools.

A possibly out-of-date or incomplete enumeration of state testing initiatives designed to satisfy the requirements of the ESSA can be found at List of state achievement tests in the United States.

- California Assessment of Student Performance and Progress (CASPP), replaced California Standardized Testing and Reporting Program (STAR) in 2013.
- Connecticut Mastery Test (CMT)
- Hawaii Smarter Balanced Assessment (SBA). The SBA is a test set developed by the Smarter Balanced Assessment Consortium of US states.
- Maryland Comprehensive Assessment Program (MCAP)
- Massachusetts Comprehensive Assessment System (MCAS)
- Pennsylvania System of School Assessment (PSSA)

== Suspension of accountability requirements ==
An inauguration day directive on January 20, 2017, from President Donald Trump's Assistant to the President and Chief of Staff "Regulatory Freeze Pending Review" delayed implementation of new regulations, including portions of the ESSA. On February 10, 2017, Education Secretary Betsy DeVos wrote to chief state school officers that "states should continue their work" in developing their ESSA plans and noted that a revised template may be issued. In March 2017, Republican lawmakers with the support of the Trump administration used the Congressional Review Act to eliminate the Obama administration's accountability regulations.

== See also ==
- Social policy and Education policy
