= Keyes v. School District No. 1, Denver =

Keyes v. School District No. 1
- Supreme Court of the United States

Argued October 12, 1972 Decided June 21, 1973
- Full case name: Wilfred Keyes et al. v. School District No. 1, Denver, Colorado, et al.
- Citations: 413 U.S. 189 (more) 93 S. Ct. 2686; 37 L. Ed. 2d 548
- Argument: Oral argument

Case history
- Prior: 445 F.2d 990 (10th Cir. 1971); cert. granted, 404 U.S. 1036 (1972).

Holding
- A prima facie case of unlawful segregative design on the part of school authorities places to those authorities the burden of proving that other segregated schools within the system were not also the result of intentionally segregative actions.

Court membership
- Chief Justice Warren E. Burger Associate Justices William O. Douglas · William J. Brennan Jr. Potter Stewart · Byron White; Thurgood Marshall · Harry Blackmun; Lewis F. Powell Jr. · William Rehnquist

Case opinions
- Majority: Brennan, joined by Douglas, Stewart, Marshall, Blackmun
- Concurrence: Burger (in result)
- Concurrence: Douglas
- Concur/dissent: Powell
- Dissent: Rehnquist
- White took no part in the consideration or decision of the case.

Laws applied
- U.S. Const. amend. XIV

Keyes v. School District No. 1, Denver, 413 U.S. 189 (1973), was a United States Supreme Court case that claimed de facto segregation had affected a substantial part of the school system and therefore was a violation of the Equal Protection Clause. In this case, black and Hispanic parents filed suit against all Denver schools due to racial segregation. The decision on this case, written by Justice William J. Brennan, was key in defining de facto segregation. Brennan found that although there were no official laws supporting segregation in Denver, "the Board, through its actions over a period of years, intentionally created and maintained the segregated character of the core city schools." As a result of the ruling, the entire district in Denver, Colorado, must be desegregated. The issue of "intent" would become a key factor in the Boston case.

== Background ==
After the Supreme Court of the United States ruled in both Brown v. Board of Education and Brown II that racially segregated schools in the United States were unconstitutional, many states began the arduous process of desegregating their public school systems. Prior to this case many of these initial efforts to desegregate were done primarily in the southern states, as segregation by law was far more common than in the northern states.

However, in one school district located in Denver, Colorado, there had been evidence of de facto school segregation almost 15 years after the Brown ruling. The Denver school district was accused of maintaining this de facto segregation by means of attendance zones, optional zones, and mobile classroom units in the Park Hill neighborhood. But in April 1969, a plan was put forth by the superintendent of the school board to begin desegregating public schools in the Denver Area by means of integrated busing.

However, two months later after these plans were introduced, a new superintendent was voted in to power over the incumbent. The new superintendent cancelled the previous integration plan all together.

Less than two weeks later, a group of parents brought suit against the Denver School District, alleging that the entirety of the Denver school system was guilty of racial segregation and was therefore in violation of their 14th Amendment right to Equal Protection of the laws. The defending party rejected this claim, asserting that even if it was true that the Denver School District was guilty of racial segregation that did not mean that all other school districts in the Denver area were likewise guilty.

== Holding ==
Writing for the majority, Justice William Brennan ruled against the Denver School District authority and held that "where, as in this case, a policy of intentional segregation has been proved with respect to a significant portion of the school system, the burden is on the school authorities (regardless of claims that their 'neighborhood school policy' was racially neutral) to prove that their actions as to other segregated schools in the system were not likewise motivated by a segregative intent." Thus, the evidence of segregation in the Denver School District was determined to be of such significance that it implicated the entire Denver school system as a result.

In relation to the fact that much of the segregation at question was a result of a de facto nature for ten years, the Majority also held that, "if the actions of school authorities were to any degree motivated by segregative intent and the segregation resulting from those actions continues to exist, the fact of remoteness in time certainly does not make those actions any less 'intentional'."
