= Migrant education =

Education programs offered specifically for migrant groups

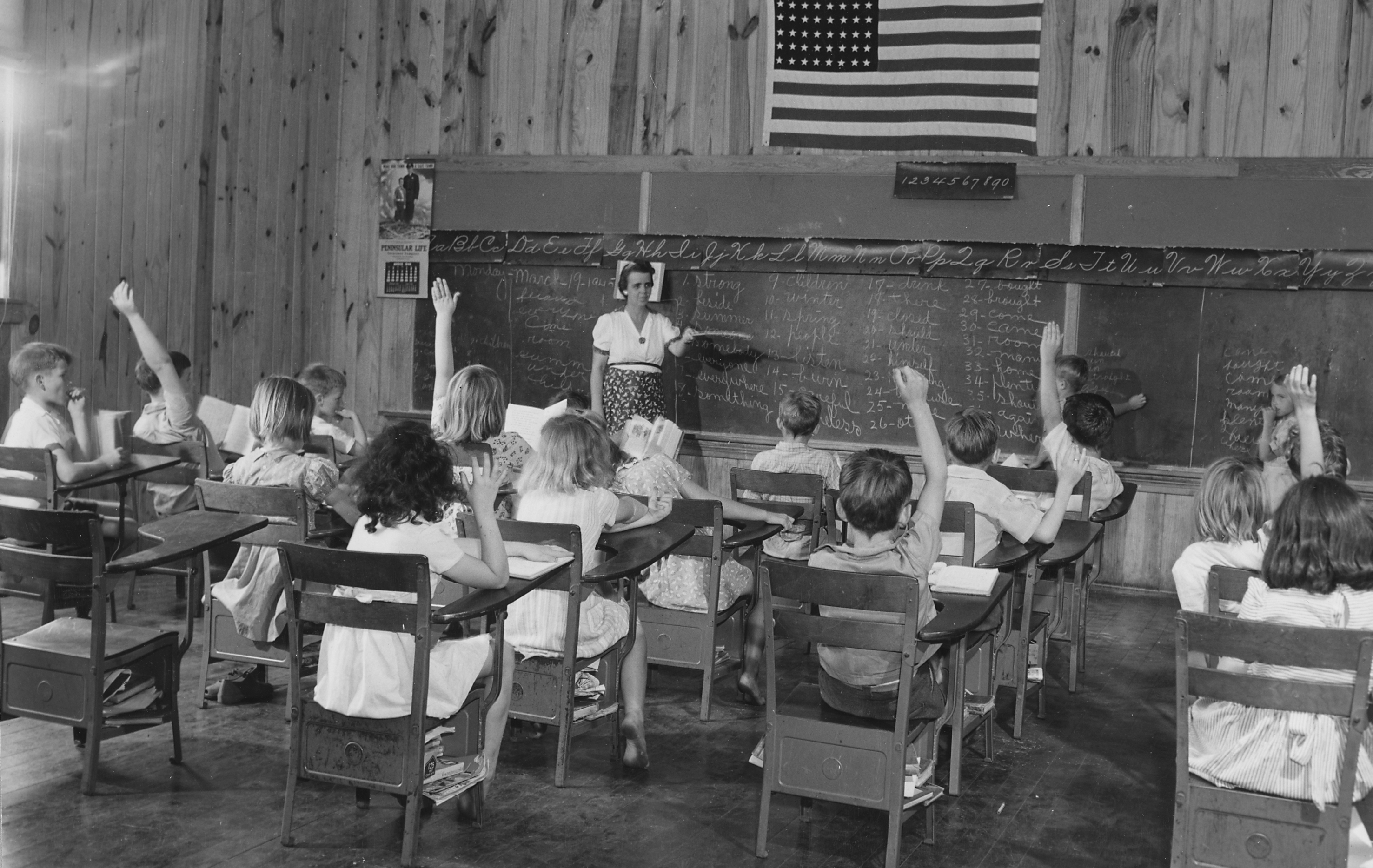
A school for the children of white migrant farm workers, circa 1945

Children of migrant workers struggle to achieve the same level of educational success as their peers. Relocation causes discontinuity in education, which causes migrant students to progress slowly through school and drop out at high rates. Additionally, relocation has negative social consequences on students: isolation from peers due to cultural differences and language barriers. Migrant children, defined as those who relocate because of involvement with agriculture-related industries or other seasonal work, are also at a disadvantage because the majority live in extreme poverty and must work with their parents to support their families. These barriers to equal educational attainment for children of migrant workers are present in countries all over the world. Although the inequality in education remains pronounced, government policies, non-governmental organizations, non-profits, and social movements are working to reverse its effects.

== Barriers to educational success ==
=== Cultural differences ===
Cultural differences that cause difficulties in assimilation and also lead to prejudice and xenophobia against migrant families are common deterrents from receiving equal educational opportunities. These prejudices can be formalized by restrictive regulations, or they can be informal but negatively affect the learning atmosphere of a school. Students who don't feel welcome or wanted because of their migrant status are less likely to remain in school. Additionally, students who struggle with cultural adjustment often fail to form connections and make friends in school, which affects their academic achievement.

=== Language differences ===
Language differences are another common barrier to educational success. Migrant students that speak a language other than the region's dominant language struggle with basic comprehension and literacy, which affects success in school. Even students who are fluent in the regions dominant language but face challenges with the written or academic form of the language are often placed in lower-level or special education classes that have the potential to undermine their academic proficiency. Additionally, while a student may have a high level of language acquisition, cultural differences that include short answer responses, unexpected expressions, and mannerisms, can be misunderstood as language deficit. Schools that have contemplated a separate program for second language learning face challenges with limited resources and an insufficient number of participating students. Language challenges amongst migrant students create a significant barrier given that language deficiency is often tied to alienation and ridicule from peers, and in some cases, academic punishment.

=== Lack of information ===
Migrant parents are often unaware of their children's right to education or are unfamiliar with the structure of the local public education system. For example, many migrant farmworker parents in the United States do not know they have a right to hold copies of their children's transcripts and school records, which are needed to enroll students in new schools. This makes transferring schools more difficult, taking time away from the student's education. After moving to a new place, parents must focus their energy on finding work and providing for their families, which often means that they do not have time to explore educational options for their children. Additionally, most migrant parents speak a different language, which also affects their ability to receive information.

=== Psychological difficulties ===
Trauma and other psychological difficulties are common among migrant populations, especially refugees who are forced into migratory status due to political, social, or religious turmoil at home. Adjustment to a new culture, language, and home is also difficult and can lead to psychological strain on migrant families. According to a 2008 study conducted by the Universities of Melbourne and Hong Kong, migrant students are more prone to depression and separation anxiety than their non-migrant peers. This is apparent in the United States where undocumented students who succeeded in making the difficult journey across the border face psychological difficulties due to fear of being separated from their families through deportation. Another factor contributing to increased rates of depression and anxiety among migrant youth is discrimination in school. In the University of Melbourne study, the demographic that faced the most psychological difficulties were migrant teenage boys who had experienced discrimination in school and/or domestic conflict.

=== Residential dislocation ===
Many difficulties arise due to the movement of migrant students from one school to another. Children often must adjust to new curricula, testing requirements, and they also must navigate different systems of credit accrual. When migrant students move during the middle of a school year, they are often discouraged from enrolling mid-way through a semester, which disrupts education and has lasting psychological effects. Additionally, when students (especially those in migrant farmworker families) anticipate frequent dislocation, they are less likely to enroll in advanced classes that would increase their prospects of attaining a post-secondary education.

=== Living conditions ===
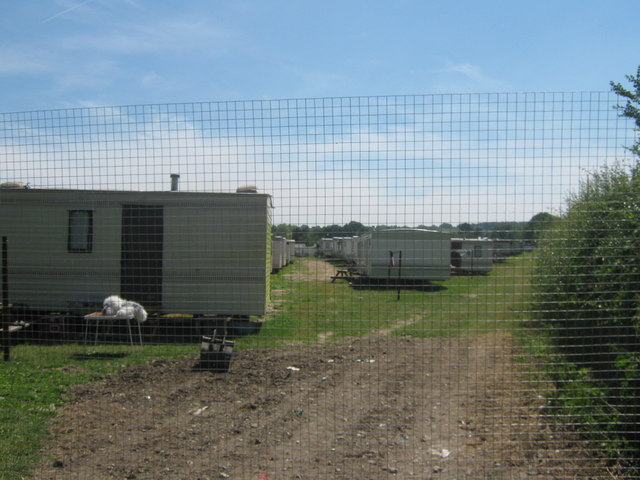
This large field is filled with mobile homes. Temporary accommodation for many migrant workers working on the acres of orchards of Selling Court Farm.

Migrant and immigrant children are four times as likely to live in substandard, crowded housing conditions than are non-migrant and non-immigrant children. Many migrant farmworkers live with a large number of extended family members in migrant camps or temporary housing. This density of people in a small, poorly lit and sparsely furnished space is not conducive to studying. Migrant farmworker camps are located close to agricultural fields and not necessarily within walking distance of the local schools, which poses a problem when reliable transportation is also an issue for some families. Many living accommodations have minimal cooking appliances or refrigeration, which for many migrant students means more time spent preparing meals than studying. Some of the migrant worker's accommodations also lack fresh drinking water or sanitation facilities, which increases migrant student's risk of getting sick.

=== Cost ===
The cost of schooling can also prevent equal access to education. Migrant families, especially migrant farm-working families, have low socioeconomic status and can't afford to pay extra fees on schooling. Even in countries where there are no extra fees for migrant students, there is often an economic disincentive to sending a child to school when they could be working to supplement their parents' incomes.

== In the United States ==
=== Demographics ===
The exact demographics of migrant students in the United States are difficult to calculate because they move across state and national borders, have different levels of citizenship status, and have limited English proficiency, complicating survey and census data. However, in 2002, the US Department of Education, estimated that there are 783,867 migrant children who meet the federal definition of "migrant" as set forth in the eligibility requirements for government support (see Government programs below). This refers to children who have moved school districts within the last 3 years due to agricultural work or work in related industries.

==== Race ====
The racial breakdown of these migrant students is 86% Hispanic, 8% White, and less than 3% Black, American Indian/Alaskan Native, and Asian/Pacific Islander.

==== Language ====
84% of these students speak little to no English, and about 90% speak a language other than English in their homes. The states with the highest level of students with limited English proficiency are Arizona (with 51% LEP migrant students) and Texas (with 37% LEP migrant students).

==== Location ====
Distribution of migrant students in the U.S.

State/Territory	Number of MEP	Percentage of U.S. Total
California	166,793	30.8%
Texas	95,703	17.6%
Florida	33,068	6.1%
Puerto Rico	21,224	3.9%
Michigan	19,167	3.5%
Oregon	18,494	3.4%

==== Education ====
Of all of the foreign-born migrants in the United States, 22% have less than a 9th grade education. This percentage breaks down differently by country of origin, with migrants from Asia arriving with the most education and migrants from Latin America arriving with the least.

Region of Origin	Percent of population 25+ years with less than a 9th grade education
Total foreign born	22.2%
Europe	12.7%
Asia	10%
Latin America	34.6%
Other regions	7.3%
Native	4.7%

Region of Origin	Percent of population with Bachelor's degree or higher
Total foreign born	25.8%
Europe	32.9%
Asia	44.9%
Latin America	11.2%
Other regions	36.8%
Native	25.6%

With regards to educational attainment, only six percent of foreign-born migrant farmworkers have completed 12th grade.

=== Legislation and policy ===
Starting in the 1960s, the United States' government has passed a series of legislation intended to improve the lives of migrant and immigrant students. In 1968, the Bilingual Education Act allocated funding to individual school districts for the creation of bilingual education programs. As part of the Equal Educational Opportunity Act (EEOA) of 1974, the federal government required schools to recognize the language barriers in migrant communities and offer support for non-English speaking students. The No Child Left Behind Act, however, created new testing requirements that make it difficult for migrant students who might transfer school districts before taking a required test, negatively affecting their ability to progress in school.

=== Government programs ===
==== Migrant Education Program ====
In 1965, as part of President Lyndon B. Johnson's War on Poverty, Title I of the 1965 Elementary and Secondary Education Act (ESEA) was framed to help support economically disadvantaged students within the United States. However, this act failed to address the specific non-economic barriers faced by migrant workers and their families so it was amended in 1966 to include the Migrant Education Program (MEP). MEP provides support for children of migrant workers through educational services such as extended school days, summer programs, ESL classes, etc. Eligibility requirements are solely based on the mobility of children and not on their economic or cultural struggles as migrants. This was because Title I already focuses on economically disadvantaged children, so it was assumed that children who qualify for MEP would be receiving benefits from those pre-existing anti-poverty programs. To be included in the Migrant Education Program, children must have had moved school districts for temporary or seasonal agricultural work within the past 3 years. The definition of who qualifies has changed several times since 1966. In 1974, the MEP expanded in scope by including migratory fishing, meat-packing, and other agriculture-related jobs into the categories of eligibility. This was also the year that the period of eligibility was increased from 3 years to 6 years after relocating school districts; however, in 1994 with the passage of the Improving America's Schools Act, it was returned to 3 years. In 1994, the definition of who qualified for MEP was further limited to those children who moved school districts for agriculture-related work that represented their family's "principle means of livelihood."

In 2001, the No Child Left Behind Act re-authorized MEP and mandated that the federal funding is focused on the "neediest students" with the "highest risk of academic failure". Although NCLB re-authorized MEP, the main goals of the program reflect what was already laid out in the 1960s. These goals include supporting educational programs to address educational disruptions, protecting migrant children from being penalized for the differences between State curriculums and graduation requirements, designing assistance programs to address the special needs of migrant children. The Migrant Education Program also facilitates coordination of educational services between states. The Migrant Student Record Transfer System (MSRTS) and the New Generation System (NGS) collect students' records and mails them between school districts, which helps provide continuity in education for students who move across state lines.

The primary criticism of the EDEA's Migrant Education Program is its constantly evolving definition of "migrant student", which makes counting the number of migrants and analyzing statistics difficult. Second, not all migrants are treated equally by the EDEA: former migrant families that have permanently settled down are not included in the definition of "migrant" so they aren't eligible for the benefits of MEP despite still being at a disadvantage. Third, the MEP doesn't resolve the problem of students moving schools across state lines, learning different curriculums, and then struggling with state-specific standardized tests.

==== High School Equivalency Program ====
The High School Equivalency Program (HEP) is designed to assist migratory and seasonal farm workers to obtain the equivalent to a high school diploma, to find additional skill training or post-secondary schooling, or to find employment. Each year, it serves at least 7,000 students who qualify for the program by being 16 years of age or older and not currently enrolled in school. The HEP is tailored to the needs of migrant workers by being flexible and allowing students to attend classes based on their own convenience. Additionally, the HEP provides free transportation, and all of its staff members are bilingual.

==== College Assistance Migrant Program ====
The College Assistance Migrant Program (CAMP) is the only national support program aimed at supporting migrant students through the college experience. CAMP was originally created through the U.S. Office of Economic Opportunity program of 1972 before being shifted to the U.S. Department of Labor the following year and to the U.S. Department of Education in 1980. CAMP is funded through discretionary grants that are granted to different non-profit organizations and institutions of higher education. These grants are awarded so that different institutions can provide financial aid, career counseling, tutoring, summer enrichment programs, etc. for migrant students. One of the criticisms of CAMP is that there are not enough spaces available for every eligible student who applies for support. Right now, CAMP only supports roughly 2000 college students per year. Furthermore, due to an increase in undergraduate tuition rates, the number of students supported by CAMP has decreased.

==== Migrant Education Even Start ====
The Migrant Education Even Start Program is focused on improving the literacy of migrant children and adults by supporting existing family literacy projects that operate through the government, universities, private organizations, etc. The Even Start program is focused on increasing children's and families' capabilities by using migrant families' existing resources, cultural traditions, and networks to jumpstart their success. The instructional services included in this program include Adult Basic Education, Adult Secondary Education, English as a Second Language, and GED certification. The downside to the Even Start program is that many adults are not able to complete their education due to time constraints and lack of childcare.

=== Nonprofit assistance ===
In addition to government programs, many non-profit organizations work to help migrant workers and their children achieve educational success. Many programs focus on assisting migrant workers to secure work and decent living conditions, while other programs focus on education. Non-profit organizations offer different types of educational services for migrant workers and their children. Some work with migrants to upgrade or teach technical skills that would be helpful for finding employment. Other organizations aim to educate migrants on workplace rights, so that they are knowledgeable on how to handle workplace abuse, which is common among undocumented migrant workers.

The most widely utilized form of non-profit assistance is English as a Second Language (ESL) education. Of the 20% of crop workers that have taken at least one adult education class, 10% took English language classes. After English language education, many non-profits offer GED education and tutoring because passing the GED can increase educational and occupational opportunities. Organizations such as Project Avanzando in California provide GED instruction, and services to help students transition into college.

For adult learners, participating in these programs can be difficult due to lack of transportation, childcare, confidence, or flexibility in work schedule. Chances of attending adult education classes are higher for crop workers with the most previous educational experiences as well as for authorized workers. Unauthorized workers have a 10% chance of participating in classes versus the 32% chance of authorized workers.

=== Internationals Network for Public Schools ===
The Internationals Network for Public Schools is a non-profit supporting public school in providing tailored curriculum for refugee students. In this network of over 30 schools spanning the United States, we see specialized learning environments that are designed for multilingual students. These schools emerged from the basement of a New York community college. Immediately popular and meeting a felt need, it inspired countless other schools in the area. At first, these programs were “funded through a Title VII grant as well as the Annenberg Challenge: New York Networks for School Renewal,” but eventually, as the demand grew greater and these programs gained public attention, it gained funding from the Bill and Melinda Gates Foundation in 2004 and became a nonprofit network integrated into public school districts across the country. This nonprofit network, “does not function as a regulatory body, but rather as a support system that provides essential services to the schools—including professional development, mentorship, and research—and serves as the engine of new school growth”. While this network is a separate entity from the schools themselves, these schools are still categorized as public schools which is why they face scrutiny from more traditional educators for their alternative teaching methods.

This institution of schools integrates a variety of innovative teaching practices in hopes of providing a more equitable education for migrant students. One major educational strategy these schools utilize is deeper learning. Deeper learning goes beyond traditional practices such as lectures, basic homework assignments, and just exams. It is built more on collaborative learning, breaking down and talking through the process, and using the information in a real-world application to ensure these students fully grasp the material being taught. This practice also better prepares students of marginalized backgrounds for the realities of the world and ensures they can thrive in the real-world economy.

This strategy is critical for the education of English Language Learners as it is difficult to navigate the academic language with just a conversational understanding. Language of instruction and emotional learning are highlighted. Students learn new languages while at the same time using their home language in school as they adapt. These hands-on educational practices are paired with emotional and career support with counselors and welfare workers to address the significant turmoil these students have experienced.

=== Specialized School Programs ===
Currently there are specialized high school programs that are tailored for individuals of migrant background. This includes the NYC international school program and Oakland International High School to name a few. These programs are tailored for individuals of these backgrounds in order to provide them with a structure that fits their needs. This includes more hands on english education, counseling, and special methods that highly differ from traditional schools in the United States. Within these programs, students are significantly more successful in life since they are able to improve academically.

=== Educational success ===
The educational achievement gap between migrant children and non-migrant children is prevalent across the United States. Migrant students generally have lower standardized test scores than the district or state-wide average. In addition to inequality in test scores, there is a persistent graduation gap between migrant and non-migrant students. The national drop-out rate among migrant farmworker students is 50%. In the population of Hispanic immigrants, graduation completion rates correlate to the age in which the student migrated to the United States. The earlier a student immigrates to the United States, the higher their chances are at completing high school.

Age when immigrated to US from Mexico	Graduation rate
15 – 21 years	28%
5 – 15 years	40%
0 – 5 years	78%

These high drop-out rates are often the result of too many school absences, which is common for students who need to support their families by working in the fields or babysitting younger siblings. Before dropping out, increased absences can lead to migrant students being held back a year in school. The more this happens, the wider the age discrepancy between students becomes, which furthers the likelihood of dropping out of school.

=== Possible solutions ===
Because of the complex and interwoven nature of the different issues facing migrant students, there is no consensus of how to solve the inequalities in educational opportunity, attainment, and achievement. Members of the University of Texas at Austin argue that the creation of "advocate educators," whose role it is to support the rights of migrant students and act as a solution for bridging gaps between educational institutions and students. A 2001 study conducted along the Texas-Mexican border concluded that advocate educators who demonstrated cross-cultural empathy and an understanding of the nature, context, and needs of migrant farmworkers fostered the educational success of migrant students. Teachers who are better educated on the experiences of migrant farmworkers will help eliminate prejudice and low expectations of students, which in turn, will encourage students to perform better in school. Along these lines, it is also argued that combatting prejudice and racial stereotypes within the wider community will help decrease prejudice in school and help migrant students. Other suggested interventions include finding a more efficient way of making up absences or missed curriculum due to school transfers and increasing the minimum wage of migrant farmworkers. Studies suggest that students have to stay after school constantly to make-up missed work lose motivation and become quickly discouraged with the educational system. By raising the minimum wage of migrant farmworkers, policy makers would decrease the opportunity cost of education because children would no longer be needed to financially support the family.

== In China ==
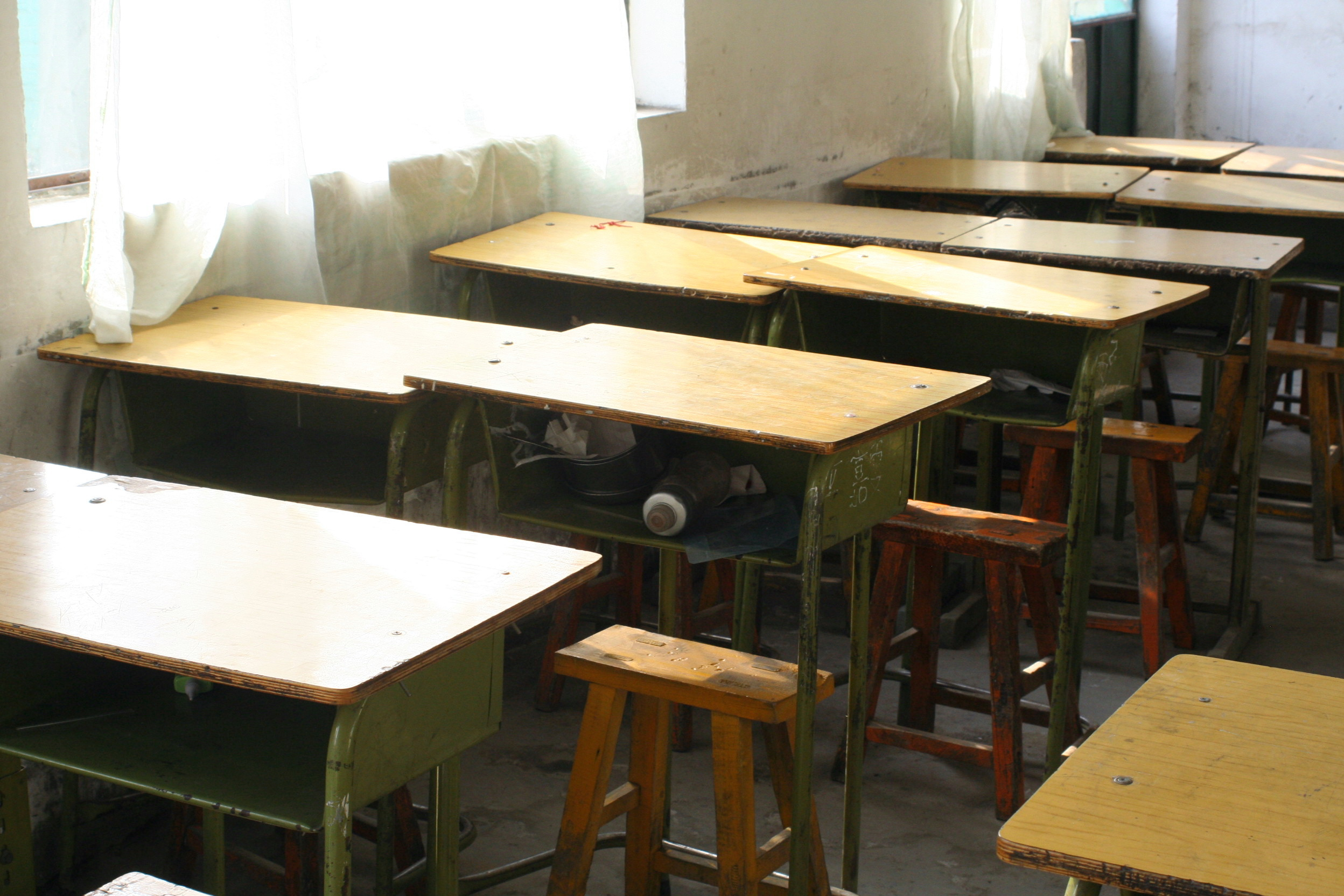
Classroom in a school for migrant students in Beijing (Dongba district).

The primary form of migration within China isn't that of rural-rural farming migration, but that of rural-urban migration. Through the hukou system, a form of citizenship registration, the Chinese government divides citizens into one of two categories of: urban or rural. Historically, this has created a hierarchy between urban and rural citizens because strict regulations give urbanites more access to healthcare, education, food, etc. Migration has led to a changing demographic of cities. According to the 2010 Census, 210 million urban-to-rural migrants are living in cities, without official hukou registration. Of these migrants, about 20 million are children between the ages of 6 and 14 years struggling to receive quality education because they are not registered within the school district. Many local governments require that everyone complete at least 9 years of education; however, migrant children weren't allowed to enroll in urban schools until 1996. The Ministry of Education issued "Provisional Measures for the Education of Migrant Children" in 1998, but because this was not actually legally binding, many factors continue to prohibit migrants from receiving education:

- The hukou system requires that rural children must pay extra fees to attend urban schools.
- School administrations require migrant children to show at least 9 official documents before enrolling, including a temporary residence certificate (which requires that the child's parents have a work permit and money to pay for the certificate).
- Many public schools require fees like the "education compensation fee" and the "temporary schooling fee" specifically for migrant children.

For rural migrant children who do succeed in enrolling in state schools, discrimination is prevalent: in most schools, migrant children do not receive official grades and can not receive academic honors. Because of this, many parents choose to send their children to unlicensed, privately run migrant-specific ("black") schools. The quality of education in these schools is poor because they lack the same resources as state schools—specifically qualified teachers. Depending on the region, these "black" schools are also under threat of closure. In 2007 in Shanghai, every unlicensed migrant school in the center of the city was closed. However, schools on the outskirts of the city and in the majority migrant Xiamen Special Economic Zone, 34 unlicensed schools were allowed.

Researchers cite the Chinese government's quest for "population quality" as the primary reason for continued exclusionary policies against rural migrants. However, there are other consequences to the continuation of these policies, as explained by Charlotte Goodburn:

It is difficult to predict precisely what the results of these exclusionary policies will be. However, it seems reasonable to suppose that if these problems are not addressed they will have a serious impact on China's future development. Not only will a large section of the population not have the skills necessary for China's further economic development, but they will also lack the kind of education needed to develop the capabilities for leading decent, happy and successful lives.

== In South Africa ==
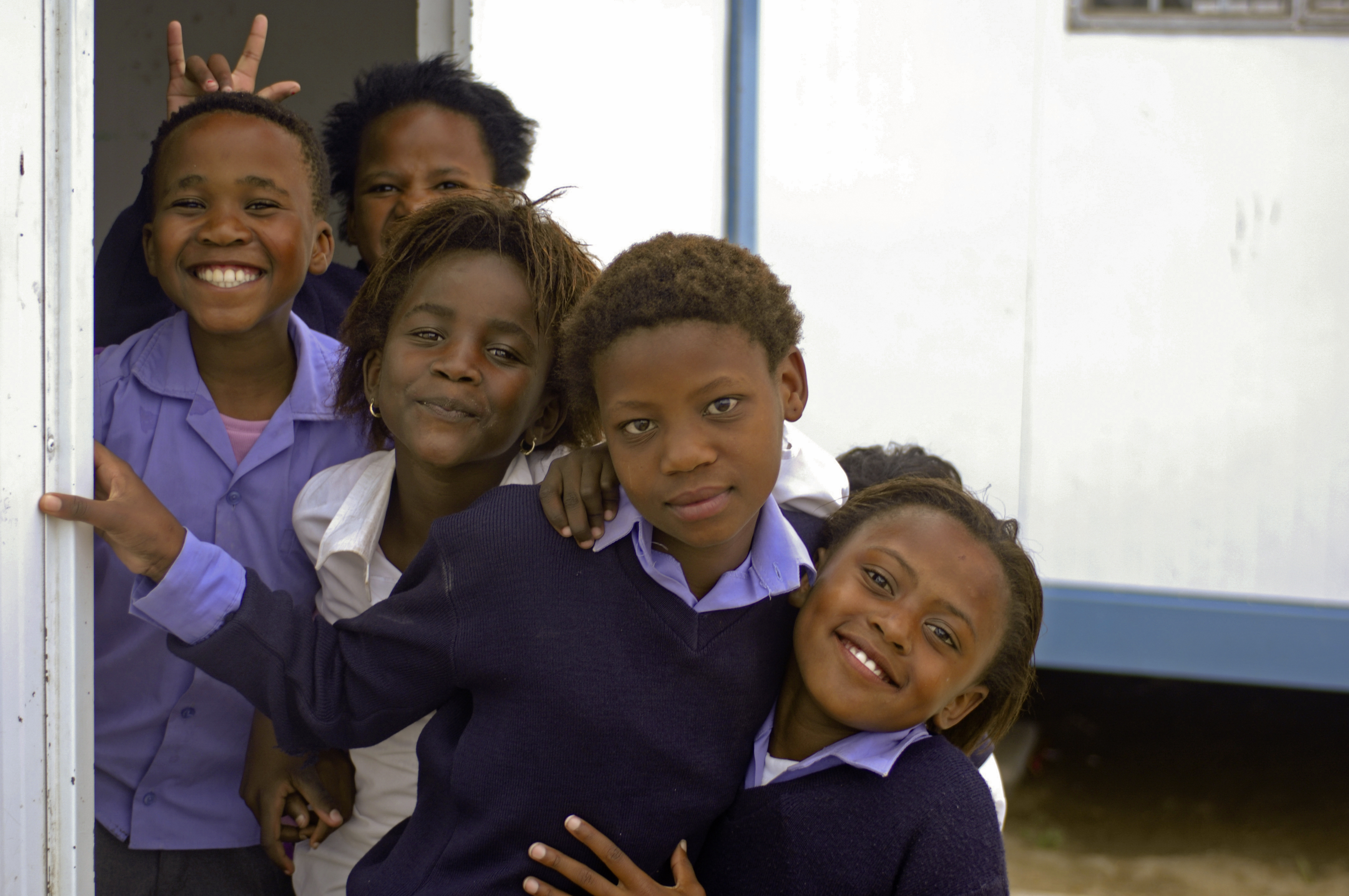
School children in Hermanus, South Africa

South Africa's migrant population is mainly composed of refugee groups from other countries in Africa. The South African Constitution guarantees refugees and asylum seekers the right to education. However, in addition to the widespread xenophobia and prejudice, migrants face many systemic barriers that reduce their educational attainment.

One such barrier in South Africa is that many migrants are turned away from public schooling because of a lack of documentation (such as report cards, transfer forms, birth certificates, etc.) Second, language difference is a significant barrier for students from French or Portuguese-speaking countries who must continue their education in the predominantly English-speaking South Africa. Third, according to the Gauteng Department of Education, the recent influx of migrants has "led to enormous pressure on the education system, resulting in overcrowding in ... schools."

South African civil society organizations, such as People Against Suffering, Oppression and Poverty (PASSOP) and Agency for Refugee Educational Skills and Advocacy are working to combat the issue of migrant education. Community based social movements such as the Equal Education movement are fighting for educational equality in South Africa through research, analysis, and activism. The Three2Six Project, which is donor-funded, also helps by offering free schooling to migrant children who are turned away from public schools.

== See also ==
- Achievement gap in the United States
- Educational attainment in the United States
- Educational inequality
- Job migration
- Migration in the People's Republic of China
- Multicultural education
- Office of Migrant Education
- Racial achievement gap in the United States
- Working class education
