= Chinese migrant =

Chinese migrant may refer to:

- Migration in China
- Overseas Chinese
