= Office of Migrant Education =

The Office of Migrant Education (OME) is a program within the U.S. Department of Education's Office of Elementary and Secondary Education (OESE) that administers grant programs that provide academic and supportive services to the children of families who migrate to find work in the agricultural and fishing industries. OME also administers several contracts and special initiatives.

The Office of Migrant Education was created out of a response from the public out-cry resulting from Edward R. Murrow's 1960 documentary "Harvest of Shame." This documentary described the deplorable working conditions and interrupted educational experiences of many migrant children. Federal Migrant Education, was therefore, created to remediate the educational deficiencies that many migrant children had. The legal premise that supported the idea of migrant education was that all students regardless of national origin deserved an equal opportunity of access to high quality, fee public education.

== Administered programs ==
The administered programs, as of June 2006, include:

=== College Assistance Migrant Program ===
(CAMP)- Assists migrant and seasonal farmworkers and their children to successfully complete the first undergraduate year of study in a college or university, and provides follow-up services to help students continue in postsecondary education.

=== High School Equivalency Program ===
(HEP) - Assists migrant and seasonal farmworkers and their children who are 16 years of age or older to obtain a High School Equivalency (HSE) certificate or the equivalent to a high school diploma and subsequently to gain employment in a career position or the military or entry into postsecondary education. Since most HEP programs are located at Institutions of Higher Education (IHEs), migrant and seasonal farmworkers also have opportunities to attend cultural events, academic programs, and other educational and cultural activities usually not available to them.

=== MEP Consortium Incentive Grants ===
On an annual basis, the Secretary may reserve up to $3 million to award grants to State educational agencies (SEAs) that participate in a consortium arrangement with another State or appropriate entity to improve the delivery of services to migrant children whose education is interrupted. The grants are used by the SEAs to provide additional direct educational and support services to migrant children.

=== Migrant Education Coordination Support Center ===
A logistics and project support services contract that provides the logistical support and technical assistance needed to arrange effective meetings and facilitate special projects that are national in scope and are in support of the interstate and intrastate coordination of migrant education programs.

=== Migrant Education Even Start (MEES) ===
MEES is designed to help break the cycle of poverty and improve the literacy of participating migrant families by integrating early childhood education, parenting education, and adult literacy or adult basic education (including English language training, as appropriate) into a unified family literacy program. MEES is funded from a three percent set-aside under the Even Start Family Literacy State Grants program. Grants are made directly to projects in areas that include significant concentrations of migrant agricultural families with children from birth through 3 years of age.

=== Migrant Education National Hotline (ESCORT) ===
The Hotline provides a toll-free number (800-234-8848) for migrant farm workers and their families to call from anywhere in the country. The Hotline is designed to help enroll migrant children in school and to access migrant education program services. Hotline specialists, who take calls, also refer callers to appropriate agencies and organizations when they are seeking other supportive services, such as housing, transportation, health or legal aid.

=== Title I Migrant Education Program (MEP) ===
The MEP provides formula grants to State educational agencies (SEAs) to establish or improve programs of education for migratory children. The overarching purpose of the MEP is to ensure that children of migrant workers have access to and benefit from the same free, appropriate public education, including public preschool education, provided to other children. To achieve this purpose, MEP funds help state and local educational agencies remove barriers to the school enrollment, attendance, and achievement of migrant children.

== See also ==
- Migrant education
- Migrant worker
