= History of migration to Sichuan =

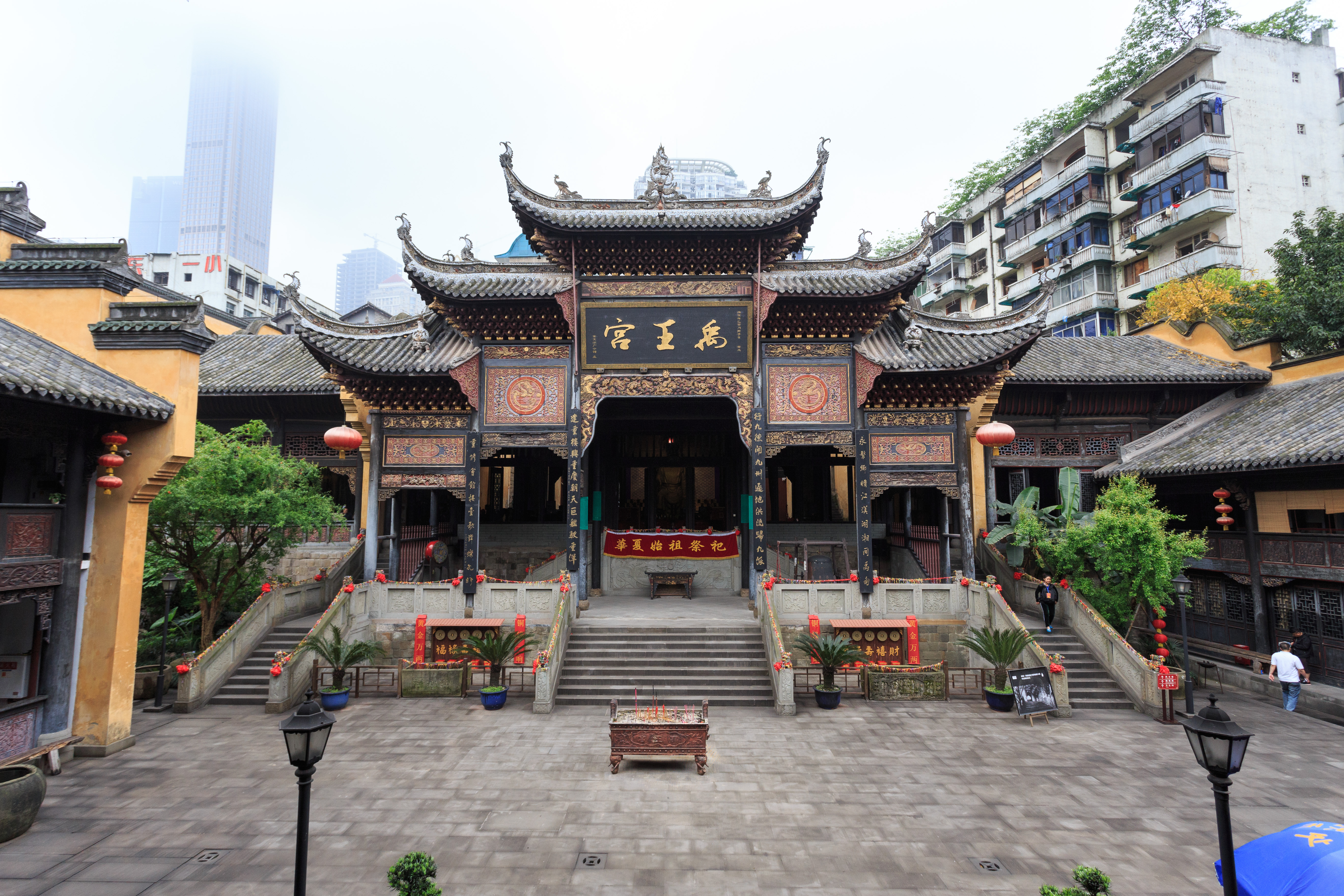
The Huguang Guild Hall in Chongqing, a testament to the massive Qing-era migration from Huguang and other provinces.

The history of migration to Sichuan (including today's Sichuan province and Chongqing municipality) encompasses several major waves of migration over millennia, profoundly shaping the region's demographics, culture, language, and economy. Situated in the fertile Sichuan Basin in Southwest China, the region, often known as the "Land of Abundance" (天府之國, Tiānfǔ zhi guó), has both attracted and necessitated large-scale population movements due to factors including conquest, political instability, devastating warfare, government policy, and economic opportunity.

The most significant event was the Huguang fills Sichuan (湖廣填四川, Húguāng tián Sìchuān). It was an migration movement initiated by government during the Qing dynasty, which repopulated the province after catastrophic devastation during the Ming-Qing transition. Earlier migrations occurred following the Qin conquest in the 4th century BCE and during subsequent dynasties like the Han, Tang, and Song. In the 20th century, Sichuan again experienced major influxes, notably during the Second Sino-Japanese War when Chongqing served as China's wartime capital, and during the Third Front construction campaign under Mao Zedong. These migrations have resulted in a diverse population with unique cultural characteristics.

== Early history (Pre-Yuan) ==
=== Ancient Ba-Shu cultures ===
The Sichuan Basin was originally home to distinct cultures, primarily the Ba in the east (around modern Chongqing and Langzhong) and the Shu in the west (around modern Chengdu). The Shu culture, associated with the Jinsha and Sanxingdui archaeological site (dating back potentially to the 2nd millennium BCE), developed a sophisticated Bronze Age industry and unique artistic traditions. The Ba people were known for their martial prowess and distinct totemic beliefs, particularly involving the white tiger, in contrast to Shu people's beliefs involving birds. Archaeological evidence also suggests possible Neolithic migrations into the region, potentially by Proto-Sino-Tibetan speakers from the Yellow River valley.

=== Qin conquest and resettlement (c. 316 BCE onwards) ===
In 316 BCE, the state of Qin conquered the Ba and Shu kingdoms, incorporating Sichuan into its expanding territory. This marked the beginning of significant Han Chinese settlement. The Qin implemented large-scale, often coercive, migration policies across their empire to consolidate control, populate frontiers, and provide labour. Sichuan received various groups of settlers, including soldiers, relocated peasant populations, exiled aristocrats from conquered states, and forcibly moved convicts and wealthy industrialists. The construction of the Dujiangyan Irrigation System around 256 BCE further increased the agricultural potential of the Chengdu Plain, likely attracting more settlers.

=== Han Dynasty ===
Building on Qin-era foundations which saw significant state-directed settlement, the Han dynasty witnessed continued migration into Sichuan. The region served as a refuge during the turbulent Qin-Han transition, attracting displaced people from other parts of China due to famine and war, such as when Liu Bang's forces were based there. Early Han policies sometimes fostered settlement through incentives like tax breaks for soldiers, while Sichuan also remained a designated area for exiled officials and criminals throughout the dynasty. This pattern reinforced Sichuan's role as a receptive area for population movements from the more volatile Central Plains.

Han expansionism significantly drove migration, particularly under Emperor Wu of Han's campaigns into the "Southwestern Yi" territories. This involved establishing new commanderies and actively settling Han Chinese farmers and administrators, leading to cultural assimilation and the displacement of indigenous Baiyue and Dian related groups. These state-led efforts, combined with economic opportunities (like salt and iron industries often developed by migrants) and the region's agricultural productivity supported by infrastructure like the Dujiangyan irrigation system, led to Sichuan becoming a populous and economically vital part of the Han empire. It also became more integrated into the Chinese cultural sphere.

=== Three Kingdoms ===
The collapse of Eastern Han authority triggered renewed migration into Sichuan, as refugees fled the chaos gripping northern China following events like the Yellow Turban Rebellion. Warlord Liu Yan notably leveraged tens of thousands of these northern immigrants from the capital region (三輔) and Nanyang to establish his power base, creating social friction with the established Sichuanese gentry. Later, Liu Bei entered Sichuan with his own army, composed largely of followers who had migrated with him previously from the north to Jingzhou. His subsequent Shu Han state heavily relied on these external military and administrative personnel, further impacting the local political landscape. Constant warfare during the Three Kingdoms period led Shu-Han under Zhuge Liang to also relocate border populations internally to maintain manpower.

Meanwhile, Zhang Lu's Daoist state in Hanzhong attracted refugees, including many people from eastern Sichuan, before Cao Cao conquered the region in 215 CE. Cao Cao then forcibly deported tens of thousands of these Hanzhong residents northwards, impacting regional demographics and spreading the Way of the Five Pecks of Rice Daoist sect. The final significant population shift was the forced exodus of the Shu-Han ruling class and elite families after the Wei conquest in 263 CE. The Wei regime systematically relocated the Shu emperor Liu Shan and the state's elite families and officials to the Wei capital Luoyang and surrounding areas. This politically motivated migration aimed to secure Wei control but also resulted in a significant loss of talent and leadership within Sichuan, contributing to a period of cultural and economic stagnation.

=== From the Sui to the Song dynasty ===
Sichuan's demographic situation was comparatively stable during the centuries spanning the Sui, Tang, Five Dynasties and Song dynasties, unlike the periods before or the upheaval that began with the Mongol invasions. Migration activity in this period was less significant than in other eras.

During the Sui dynasty (581-618) and early Tang periods, Sichuan served as a relatively stable region, attracting migrants fleeing turmoil in the Central Plains. Its reputation as a safe haven was reinforced during major upheavals like the An Lushan Rebellion (mid-8th century) and the Huang Chao Rebellion (late 9th century), when large numbers of northern Han Chinese, including imperial courts, sought refuge there. This significantly boosted Sichuan's population and socio-economic development, contributing to the conditions that allowed the Former and Later Shu kingdoms to flourish during the subsequent Five Dynasties. Concurrently, the Nanzhao kingdom to the south periodically raided Sichuan, sometimes forcibly relocating populations, particularly artisans, southward.

The following Song dynasty began with a stream of outward migration from Sichuan, as the newly established Northern Song (960-1127) moved the former Later Shu elite and skilled workers to the central plains after its conquest in 965 CE. The Northern Song era saw substantial population growth across China, including Sichuan, supported by agricultural advancements; however, population pressure and land concentration became evident within the region. Following the fall of the Northern Song capital to the Jin dynasty in 1127, Sichuan once again became a major destination for refugees, this time from the central plains, absorbing large numbers of displaced people and soldiers, which swelled its population during the Southern Song period. This peak was eventually tragically reversed by the Mongol invasions starting in the mid-13th century. Decades of brutal warfare, massacres, and resulting famine led to a catastrophic population collapse and spurred a massive eastward flight of Sichuanese refugees down the Yangtze, leaving the region severely depopulated by the start of the Yuan dynasty.

== Yuan and Ming ==
The destructive Yuan conquest drastically reduced Sichuan's population, leading to significant migration into the region during the Yuan and Ming dynasties. Yuan policies included military settlements (屯田) and encouraging various groups to settle, but Sichuan's population remained depleted compared to earlier periods.

During the Yuan period, immigrants came from several sources. These included northwestern refugees (西北流民), remnants of the Western Xia, peasants from the Jing-Hu region fleeing instability, and settlers in government-organized military and civilian agricultural colonies (军民屯田).

The late Yuan period saw widespread rebellions. Ming Yuzhen, a leader from Hubei, established the Xia regime in Chongqing in 1363, effectively ending Yuan rule in Sichuan and setting the stage for subsequent Ming-era migrations.

=== Xia Regime Migration ===
Ming Yuzhen's entry into Sichuan marked the beginning of significant population movements in the early Ming period.

==== Military settlers ====
Ming Yuzhen's army, estimated at up to 200,000 soldiers primarily originating from Hubei (including areas like Suizhou, Huangpi, and importantly, Macheng and Xiaogan), formed the initial wave. After establishing the Xia regime, these soldiers and likely their families settled in Sichuan, often in agricultural colonies organised by the regime.

==== Civilian migrants ====
The relative stability under Ming Yuzhen attracted civilian refugees, especially from the war-torn Huguang and Jiangnan regions. The Xia regime also actively recruited settlers from Hubei. Many Sichuan family histories trace their arrival to this period, frequently citing Macheng and Xiaogan in Hubei as their ancestral home. These migrants contributed to repopulating areas and re-establishing administrative units.

=== Hongwu era migration ===
After the Ming dynasty defeated the Xia regime in 1371, Sichuan's population remained critically low. An initial census in 1372 recorded only about 84,000 civilian households. Many counties were merged or downgraded due to depopulation.

To address this, the Hongwu Emperor implemented a policy of large-scale, government-organised migration to Sichuan, often referred to as "moving people to fill Sichuan" (移民实蜀), beginning shortly after the conquest in 1371. This was part of a national strategy to redistribute population from more stable or populous areas to regions devastated by war.

==== Source region and routes ====
Central China, Huguang, especially, served as a major source of immigration at the time. It's noted that this area served as a marshalling point, and many migrants moved from there might have originally come from other regions like Jiangxi. Family records frequently mention receiving official orders (奉旨) for the move. While the Yangtze River route was available, many organised groups travelled overland, likely through Hubei and Shaanxi before entering northern Sichuan and dispersing.

==== Scale and Impact ====
The organised migration during the Hongwu reign, peaking around 1377-1380, brought hundreds of thousands of new settlers. This influx allowed for the re-establishment of numerous counties by 1380-1381 and was crucial for Sichuan's agricultural and economic recovery. The immigrants, particularly those from Huguang, brought valuable agricultural techniques and new crop varieties. Their settlement patterns often targeted the most depopulated areas, like the Chengdu Plain.

== Huguang Fills Sichuan ==
A map of China's administrative divisions during the reign of Yongle; Sichuan is situated west of Huguang.

The most transformative migration in Sichuan's history occurred during the late Ming and primarily the early Qing dynasty (roughly late 17th to late 18th century). This large-scale migration movement is historically known as Huguang tian Sichuan (湖廣填四川), which translates to "Huguang fills Sichuan."

=== Background: Devastation and depopulation ===
The Ming-Qing transition (mid-17th century) brought catastrophic devastation to Sichuan, leading to a massive population decline. This was caused by prolonged warfare between Ming loyalists, Qing forces, various rebel groups, and local warlords.

Central to this period was the rebellion led by Zhang Xianzhong. He established the short-lived Daxi Kingdom (大西國) in Sichuan (1644–1647). His rule, and particularly his scorched-earth tactics upon retreating northwards to face the Qing, are associated with widespread massacres, destruction, and brutality. While some historical accounts attribute most of the killing to Zhang, modern scholarship suggests the devastation continued after his death due to ongoing conflicts and chaos.

The combined effects of warfare, Zhang's rebellion, subsequent conflicts, famine, and disease led to agricultural collapse, the destruction of infrastructure like the Dujiangyan irrigation system, and severe depopulation. The depopulation also resulted in farmland reverting to wilderness ("rewilding"), with accounts mentioning increased tiger attacks. Estimates suggest Sichuan's population plummeted dramatically, possibly from around 4 million in the late Ming to only 1 million or fewer by the 1680s. Cultivated land area also decreased drastically.

=== Qing resettlement policies ===
Recognizing the need to restore Sichuan's productivity and tax base, the Qing government, particularly under the Kangxi Emperor (r. 1661–1722), implemented policies to encourage resettlement. This contrasted with the often punitive, forced relocation methods used by the early Ming under Hongwu. Key incentives included:

- Land grants: Offering free plots of land to settlers willing to reclaim wasteland.
- Material incentives: Providing resources like oxen, seeds, and financial support.
- Tax exemptions: Offering reduced or waived taxes for a set period (e.g., five or six years) on newly cultivated land.
- Naturalisation regulations: The 1690 "Regulations on Naturalisation in Sichuan" formalized incentives for reclaiming wasteland and establishing settlements.
- Official positions: Granting official roles to leaders who brought large groups of settlers.

The 1690 "Regulations on Naturalisation in Sichuan" formalized many of these incentives, encouraging voluntary migration. Efforts were also made to persuade Sichuanese refugees who had fled to return. Later, during the Qianlong Emperor's reign (r. 1736–1795), as population pressure grew elsewhere in China, Sichuan was seen as a "safety valve," and the central government adopted a more laissez-faire attitude towards continued migration, despite concerns from local officials about social order.

=== Origins, scale, and duration ===
While named after the Huguang region (modern Hubei and Hunan), which supplied the largest number of migrants, settlers came from many provinces. Other major sources included Guangdong, Jiangxi, Fujian, and Shaanxi. Migrants included farmers attracted by land (the majority), people relocated by authorities, and those fleeing poverty or disaster elsewhere. Guild halls were established in cities like Chongqing to serve as social and economic centres for different migrant groups.

Estimated Population Growth in Sichuan (Late Ming – Qing Dynasty)
Year	Estimated Population (Millions)
Late Ming (c. 1600)	~4.0
c. 1660	~0.8
c. 1685	~1.5
c. 1720	~4.0
c. 1776	~8.0
c. 1813	~22.0
c. 1850	~30.0

The scale was immense, considered one of China's major historical migrations. Millions are estimated to have moved into Sichuan during this period. The population recovered to late-Ming levels by the 1720s and continued to grow rapidly, reaching roughly 22 million by 1813. The main influx occurred between roughly 1671 and 1776, though migration continued into the 19th century.

=== Impacts of Huguang migration ===
==== Demographics ====
Sichuan evolved into a diverse region due to significant migrations, notably from Huguang. The ancestry of much of its Han Chinese population, combined with Hakka and other groups from elsewhere in China, forged a unique, integrated regional identity from these varied origins.

==== Culture ====
The blending of peoples brought diverse customs, traditions, and arts. Guild Halls became important community centres during the Qing era. The influx of different regional opera styles during the Huguang migration contributed to the development of Sichuan opera.

==== Language ====
Modern Sichuanese Mandarin evolved from the mixture of dialects brought by migrants, particularly those from Huguang regions (Hubei, Hunan, Guangdong influences), becomes the most common language in Sichuan overlaying the earlier linguistic substrate. The earlier Ba–Shu Chinese, possibly derived from Qin settlers, is extinct.

==== Cuisine ====
Sichuan cuisine's modern form was heavily influenced by migration. While local ingredients like Sichuan pepper were traditional, the mass adoption of chili peppers (introduced to China earlier but popularised in Sichuan during the Qing) coincided with the Huguang migration. The influx brought diverse culinary techniques and preferences (e.g., from Hunan, Hubei, Guangdong), which fused with local traditions and ingredients to create the complex flavour profiles (especially mala - spicy and numbing) characteristic of today's cuisine. Key ingredients like Pixian douban represent this fusion.

==== Economy ====
Migrations restored Sichuan's agricultural base after devastation (Huguang fills Sichuan), making it a vital "food basket." Later migrations, particularly during WWII and the Third Front era, drove industrialisation and urbanisation.

== Republic of China (1912–1949) ==
After the fall of the Qing dynasty, Sichuan experienced a period of instability under competing warlords. However, the most significant migration during this era was triggered by the Second Sino-Japanese War (1937–1945).

=== Wartime capital relocation ===
In 1938, Chongqing became the provisional capital of the Nationalist government under Chiang Kai-shek. This led to a massive influx of people and resources from coastal areas threatened by the Japanese invasion. Chongqing's population at the time exploded from under 250,000 before the war to over 1 million. Hundreds of government offices, foreign embassies, factories, arsenals, universities, and schools relocated to Chongqing and other parts of Sichuan. Tens of thousands of personnel, intellectuals, workers, and refugees moved inland. This migration rapidly transformed Chongqing from an inland port into a major industrial city. Banks and financial institutions also moved inland and expanded. Despite heavy Japanese bombing campaigns, the influx contributed significantly to China's war effort.

After World War II, the capital returned to Nanjing, but Chongqing briefly served again as the Nationalist capital in late 1949 during the Chinese Civil War before the government retreated to Taiwan.

== People's Republic of China (1949–present) ==
=== Third Front Construction ===
From 1964 to roughly 1980, Sichuan was a major focus of the Third Front Construction campaign. Driven by fears of invasion by the US or USSR, Mao Zedong initiated a massive strategic relocation of industrial and military infrastructure away from coastal areas to the remote, mountainous interior. Millions of personnel (factory workers, engineers, cadres, intellectuals, soldiers, construction workers) were relocated to Sichuan and other Third Front regions. Over 1,100 major projects were established nationally, with significant investment in Sichuan.

==== Impact ====
This campaign drastically altered Sichuan's economic geography, creating major industrial cities in previously underdeveloped areas, such as Panzhihua, Mianyang, and Deyang. It stimulated local economies and promoted structural transformation, though many projects were inefficiently located due to the strategic requirement of being "close to mountains, dispersed, hidden." The migration created distinct "Third Front" communities and identities. Long-term effects included increased manufacturing employment and reduced regional inequality, though potentially hindering overall national economic efficiency.

=== Urbanization and economic migration ===
Following the reform and opening up period starting in 1978, China experienced massive urbanisation, largely driven by rural-to-urban migration. While initially lagging behind coastal regions, western China, including Sichuan, saw significant urbanisation growth. Restrictions on internal migration eased, allowing large numbers of surplus agricultural workers to move to cities seeking employment. Sichuan became a major source of migrant workers moving both to its own rapidly growing cities (like Chengdu and Chongqing) and to coastal industrial zones. This trend continues, driven by economic disparities and opportunities.

== See also ==
- Sichuan
- Chongqing
- Ba–Shu culture
- Zhang Xianzhong
- Third Front (China)
- History of Sichuan
- Migration in China
