= Migration in China =

Internal migration in the People's Republic of China refers primarily to migrants in China without local household registration status through the Chinese Hukou system. According to the International Labour Organization, it is one of the most extensive in the world due to the fact that migrants are commonly members of a floating population. In general, rural-urban migrants are mostly excluded from local educational resources, citywide social welfare programs and many jobs due to their lack of Hukou status. Migrant workers are not necessarily rural workers; they are simply people living in urban areas with rural household registration. China's government influences the pattern of urbanization through the Hukou permanent residence registration system, land-sale policies, infrastructure investment and the incentives offered to local government officials. The other factors influencing migration of people from rural provincial areas to large cities are more employment, education, business opportunities, and higher standard of living.

In 2015, the number of mingong (migrant workers) was 277.5 million—36% of the total Chinese workforce of 770 million. Out of these, migrant workers who left their hometown and worked in other provinces accounted for 158.63 million (an increase of 3.4% compared to 2010) and migrant workers who worked within their home provinces reached 94.15 million (an increase of 5.9% compared to 2010). The balance of gender for migrant workers was two-thirds male to one-third female in 2015. Estimations are that Chinese cities will face an influx of another 243 million migrants by 2025, taking the urban population up to nearly 1 billion people. This population of migrants would represent "almost 40 percent of the total urban population," a number which is almost three times the current level. While it is often difficult to collect accurate statistical data on migrant floating populations, the number of migrants is undoubtedly quite large. "In China's largest cities, for instance, it is often quoted that at least one out of every five persons is a migrant."

== History and origins ==
=== Zhou dynasty ===
During the Zhou dynasty in ancient China, migration shaped the demographic and cultural landscape. Internal migration occurred as a result of the feudal system implemented by the Zhou rulers, which divided the territory into various states, each governed by its own noble or lord. People often migrated within the realm in search of economic opportunities, safety, or to escape unfavorable conditions. Nomadic threats from groups like the Di and Qiang during the Western Zhou period also led to internal movements as communities sought refuge from these incursions. Additionally, the establishment of trade routes, including the Silk Road, facilitated both internal and external migration, fostering cultural exchange and diversity. As the dynasty expanded territorially, conquests and military campaigns likely prompted the movement of people to newly acquired lands. The migration patterns during the Zhou dynasty contributed to the cultural diversity within China and influenced regional customs and traditions that persisted throughout its long history.

=== Qing dynasty ===
From 1644 to 1912, the Qing dynasty was China's last imperial dynasty. The founder for Qing dynasty were the Manchu people, an ethnic group from Manchuria (modern-day northeastern China).

==== Manchuria ====
In 1668 during the reign of the Kangxi Emperor, the Qing government decreed a prohibition of non-Eight Banner people entering Manchuria (including modern-day Manchuria in northeast China and Outer Manchuria) where the ruling Manchus came from. Ethnic Han people were banned from settling in this region but the rule was openly violated and Han became a majority population in urban areas by the early 19th century.

However Qing rule saw a massively increasing number of Han people both illegally and legally streaming into Manchuria and settling down to cultivate land as Manchu landlords desired Han peasants to rent on their land and grow grain. Most Han migrants were not evicted as they went over the Great Wall and Willow Palisade. During the 18th century Han people farmed 500,000 hectares of privately owned land in Manchuria and 203,583 hectares of lands which were part of courtier stations, noble estates, and Banner lands, in garrisons and towns. Ethnic Han made up 80% of the population.

Han farmers were resettled from northern China by the Qing to the area along the Liao River in order to restore the land to cultivation. Wasteland was reclaimed by Han squatters in addition to other Han who rented land from Manchu landlords. Despite officially prohibiting Han settlement on regions populated by Manchu and Mongol peoples, by the 18th century the Qing decided to settle Han refugees from northern China who were suffering from famine, floods, and drought in Manchuria and Inner Mongolia. The Han people farmed 500,000 hectares in Manchuria and tens of thousands of hectares in Inner Mongolia by the 1780s. The Qianlong Emperor allowed Han peasants suffering from drought to move into Manchuria despite him issuing edicts in favor of banning them from 1740 to 1776. Han tenant farmers rented or even claimed title to land from the "imperial estates" and Manchu bannerlands in the area. Besides moving into the Liao area in southern Manchuria, the path linking Jinzhou, Fengtian, Tieling, Changchun, Hulun, and Ningguta was settled by Han people during the Qianlong Emperor's reign, and Han became the majority in urban areas of Manchuria by 1800. To increase the Imperial Treasury's revenue, the Qing sold formerly Manchu-only lands along the Sungari to Han people at the beginning of the Daoguang Emperor's reign, and Han filled up most of Manchuria's towns by the 1840s according to Abbe Huc.

==== Mongolia and Inner Mongolia ====
Ethnic Han were officially forbidden to settle in Outer Mongolia (modern Mongolia) and Inner Mongolia. Mongols were forbidden from crossing into the 18 provinces (内地) populated by the Han people without permission and were given punishments if they did. Mongols were also forbidden from crossing into another Mongol leagues. Han settlers violated the rule and crossed into and settled in Inner Mongolia.

Despite officially prohibiting Han settlement on Manchu and Mongol lands, by the 18th century the Qing decided to settle Han refugees from northern China who were suffering from famine, floods, and drought into Manchuria and Inner Mongolia. Han people farmed 500,000 hectares in Manchuria and tens of thousands of hectares in Inner Mongolia by the 1780s.

Ordinary Mongols were not allowed to travel outside their own leagues. Mongols were forbidden by the Qing from crossing the borders of their banners, even into other Mongol Banners and from crossing into the 18 provinces of the Han people and were given serious punishments if they did in order to keep the Mongols divided against each other to benefit the Qing.

During the eighteenth century, growing numbers of Han settlers had illegally begun to move into the Inner Mongolian steppe. By 1791 there had been so many Han Chinese settlers in the Front Gorlos Banner that the yasak had petitioned the Qing government to legalize the status of the peasants who had already settled there.

==== Xinjiang ====
The Qing implemented two different policies for Dzungaria (Northern Xinjiang) and the Tarim Basin (Altishahr, Southern Xinjiang). The Manchus had wiped out the native Buddhist Oirat Dzungars in their land of Dzungaria. Then the Qing implemented a large scale settlement in Dzungaria to colonize the newly empty grasslands. Han people were encouraged by the Qing to permanently settle and colonize Dzungaria while permanent Han settlers were banned from the Tarim with only Han merchants allowed. The ban was lifted in the 1820s after the invasion of Jahangir Khoja and the Han people were allowed to permanently settle in the Tarim.

Hans were around one third of Xinjiang's population in 1800, during the time of the Qing dynasty. Professor of Chinese and Central Asian History at Georgetown University, James A. Millward wrote that foreigners often mistakenly think that Urumqi was originally a Uyghur city and that the Chinese destroyed its Uyghur character and culture, however, Ürümqi was founded as a Chinese city by Han and Hui (Tungans), and it is the Uyghurs who are new to the city. While a few people try to give a misportrayal of the historical Qing situation in light of the contemporary situation in Xinjiang with Han migration, and claim that the Qing settlements and state farms were an anti-Uyghur plot to replace them in their land, Professor James A. Millward pointed out that the Qing agricultural colonies in reality had nothing to do with Uyghur and their land, since the Qing banned settlement of Han in the Uyghur Tarim Basin and in fact directed the Han settlers instead to settle in the non-Uyghur Dzungaria and the new city of Ürümqi, so that the state farms which were settled with 155,000 Han from 1760 to 1830 were all in Dzungaria and Ürümqi, where there was only an insignificant number of Uyghurs, instead of the Tarim Basin oases.

At the start of the 19th century, 40 years after the Qing reconquest, there were around 155,000 Han and Hui peoples in northern Xinjiang and somewhat more than twice that number of Uyghurs in southern Xinjiang. A census of Xinjiang under Qing rule in the early 19th century tabulated ethnic shares of the population as 30% Han and 60% Turkic, while it dramatically shifted to 6% Han and 75% Uyghur in the 1953 census, however a situation similar to the Qing era-demographics with a large number of Han has been restored as of 2000 with 40.57% Han and 45.21% Uyghur. Professor Stanley W. Toops noted that today's demographic situation is similar to that of the early Qing period in Xinjiang. In northern Xinjiang, the Qing brought in Han, Hui, Uyghur, Xibe, and Kazakh colonists after they exterminated the Zunghar Oirat Mongols in the region, with one third of Xinjiang's total population consisting of Hui and Han in the northern are, while around two thirds were Uyghurs in southern Xinjiang's Tarim Basin.

Ürümqi was settled with troops while Green Standard troops and Altishari Turkic peoples settled in Ili after being ordered to by Qianlong in 1757. Ürümqi was used as a place for exiles.

The genocide victim Dzungars were the natives of northern Xinjiang. Han, Manchu, and Southern Xinjiang's Turkic Taranchi Muslims were all colonizers in Northern Xinjiang (Dzungaria). Han soldiers of the Green Standard Army were settled in the 1770s in Ili and Ürümqi by the Qing.

Ürümqi had very little Uyghurs while it had many Hui and Han in 1787. There were 76,496 Uyghurs and 477,321 Han in 1960 Ürümqi.

==== Tibet ====
The Qing stationed both Manchu bannermen and ethnic Han soldiers of the Green Standard Army in Tibet. A community descended from Han soldiers and officials grew in Lhasa.

At multiple places such as Lhasa, Batang, Dartsendo, Lhari, Chamdo, and Litang, Green Standard troops were garrisoned throughout the Dzungar war. Green Standard Army troops and Manchu bannermen were both part of the Qing military force who fought in Tibet in the war against the Dzungars. It was said that the Sichuan commander Yue Zhongqi entered Lhasa first when the 2,000 Green Standard soldiers and 1,000 Manchu soldiers of the "Sichuan route" seized Lhasa. According to Mark C. Elliott, after 1728 the Qing used Green Standard Army troops to man the garrison in Lhasa rather than Bannermen. According to Evelyn S. Rawski both Green Standard Army and Bannermen made up the Qing garrison in Tibet. According to Sabine Dabringhaus, Green Standard Chinese soldiers numbering more than 1,300 were stationed by the Qing in Tibet to support the 3,000 strong Tibetan army.

In the mid 19th century, arriving with an Amban, a community of Han troops from Sichuan who married Tibetan women settled down in the Lubu neighborhood of Lhasa, where their descendants established a community and assimilated into Tibetan culture. Hebalin was the location of where Chinese Muslim troops and their offspring lived, resulting in the Hebalin Khache community, while Lubu was the place where Han troops and their offspring lived.

==== Sichuan and Guizhou ====
Migration to Sichuan and Guizhou happened during the Qing dynasty as a continuation of migration that started in the Yuan dynasty. That is why most people in Sichuan who speak a Han dialect speak Mandarin, while regions at the same latitude such as Guangdong, have their own dialects. Many people from areas such as Hunan moved there in search of space. They consisted of various ethnicities ranging from Han, Hui and Mongol to Yao and Miao. Many cultures already existed in Sichuan, such as the Yi, and some of the emigrants integrated into these ethnic backgrounds, even to the point of forgetting the Han language. During the Qing dynasty, people started defining themselves as locals or immigrants and there was static between the two groups.

=== People's Republic of China ===
The unique hukou system of China (emulating from Soviet model) distinguishes Chinese internal migration from migration in other developing countries. In 1958, China established the universal hukou system that restricted the mobility of the population. It aimed to tie farmers to land, secure agricultural supply as well as to support industrial sector in cities after the Great Leap Forward and Great Chinese Famine which caused at least 30 million deaths. The government allocated housing, jobs, rationed food, security service (health care, pension and insurance etc.) and other necessities based on the hukou system, which made it almost impossible for people without local hukou status to live in urban areas.

In addition to Hukou system, the people's commune system was another tool to control labor mobility. Under the people's commune system, the earnings of farmers were closely related to their daily participation in the collective farming. In 1978, during the reform and opening up, this system was replaced by the household-responsibility system, which loosened the restriction of people's mobility. In the middle 1980s, labor migration from rural to urban areas became a national phenomenon.

Huang and Pieke divide the migration policy evolution after the reform and opening up into four periods. The first period is from 1979 to 1983, during which the government still prohibited migration. The second period is from 1984 to 1988 when farmers were allowed to enter urban areas on the condition that they provided their own food. The third period is from 1989 to 1991 when migration became much more popular and had attracted much attention from the government. The fourth period is from 1992 to 2000, during which the government in some degree encouraged migration, while urban local governments controlled migration more strictly because of high unemployment rates in cities.

From 1949 to 1985, the net migration rate for China was 0.24, compared with world average of 1.84 from 1950 to 1990. Since the mid-1980s, rural to urban migration became a constant social phenomenon. Rural workers migrated in large numbers to cities and coastal areas. Zhao and Sicular report that the number of rural-urban migration doubled between the late 1980s and the mid-1990s. In 1989, there were 8.9 million migrants and in 1994 the number increased to 23.0 million.

The founding of China's special economic zones prompted migration to the SEZs from across southern and southwest China and workers, particularly younger women, could earn significantly more for factory work in SEZs than they could earn in their hometowns.

The 1994 fiscal reform also impacted patterns of migration and urbanization in China. Under the pre-1994 system of fiscal contracting, township and village enterprises (TVEs) had been an important mechanism of industrialization and most peasants who sought a factory job chose to stay in their hometowns and work at TVEs. TVEs began to decline after the 1994 reform and this contributed to major increases in workers migrating to urban areas.

Between 1978 and 1999, an estimated 174 million people migrated from China's rural areas to its urban areas.

In 2000, the Chinese government began encouraging westward migration as part of an effort to increase development in China's western and minority regions with a reallocation of technological, human, and financial resources.

In 2003, the Sun Zhigang incident occurred, in which a migrant worker was beaten to death at a custody and repatriation center (where people without appropriate urban resident permits were held) in Guangzhou. The government responded by closing all such centers and removing legal barriers that prevented rural people from working in cities. The state also cracked down on employers who failed to pay migrant workers or paid them late.

In 2006 it was estimated that China was experiencing a –0.39 per 1,000 population net migration rate. According to National Bureau of Statistics, there were 252.78 million migrant workers in China in 2011.

China established a digital social security card, which had been issued to 715 million citizens by the end of 2022. For migrant workers, the digital social security card facilitates their access to benefits and avoids the need to return to their place of household registration to access their benefits.

== Occupational profile ==
Rural-urban migrant workers have a significant presence in China's labor force. By 2006, migrant workers comprised 40% of the total urban labor force. According to data from National Bureau of Statistics, in 2009 nearly 39.1% of them worked in manufacturing, about 17.3% in construction and more than 7.8% in wholesale and retail. In addition, the number of the migrants who were employed in the tertiary sector of the economy was increasing, which indicated a new trend of employment choice. A report from International Labour Organization in 2006 states that there were also 80 million workers working in the informal sector and it was estimated that between two-thirds and three-quarters of all new employment is in the informal economy. In the informal economy, many rural migrants are engaged in low-paying and temporary jobs such as sanitation workers and porters. Zhu addresses that they are not "employed" in the informal sector, but they "have access only" to the informal sector.

Scholars agree that there is a sharp occupational segregation between migrants and the local population. A study that compared employment situations of urban residents and migrant labors in 2005 reports that around 52% of migrants were self-employed, while 12% of the local residents were self-employed; 12% of migrant workers were employed in the public sector, compared with 68% of the local workforce.

The degree of segregation varies from province to province. A series of field studies by China Center for Economic Research demonstrate that the labor market in Sichuan province is relatively integrated, while in Guangdong province and Shanghai the labor market is quite segregated with "rural migratory-worker urban-resident-worker dualism".

In addition to inadequate social protection, the primary reason of the occupational segregation is the migrant workers' lack of skills and education, which keeps them in manual labor. Migrant workers have less human capital since they have less schooling, shorter job tenure and less training compared with the local residents. Moreover, because of the high rate of job mobility among rural migrant workers, employers have little incentive to train them and thereby prevent them from increasing their social capital.

== Causes ==
The causes of migration can originate from various factors within Chinese societies. Migration in some contexts can refer to the search for self-identity and self-transformation which pushed many young workers to migrate to more urbanized areas of China. This search for self-identity and self transformation was consequence of recent globalization. "Mobility and modernity have become inextricably linked in the contemporary era of globalization". Secondly, migration to distant cities for work was not an option for most rural workers of previous generations. Migration created many opportunities for both women and men to extricate themselves from their current rural status and create a new name for themselves and their family. Thirdly, migration enabled the rural youth to become wage earners, consumers and city-dwellers which allowed them to become more globalized and mobile than they would have within their own respective villages. While the urbanization of Chinese workers provides them with more opportunity, it also can constrain them, as migrant workers, specifically females, typically make lower wages and are viewed as replaceable labor.

A population density map. The eastern, coastal provinces are much more densely populated than the western interior partly because of the opportunities available to migrants.

=== Surplus labor ===
Labor surplus in rural areas is often regarded as one of the factors of internal migration in China. Central to this theory is that surplus rural labor provides a needed work force for industrial growth in urban areas On one hand, the Household-responsibility system (HRS) established during reform and opening up was productive and generated surplus labor in rural areas. On the other hand, in urban areas the development of the special economic zones and industries created demand for labor force. Some scholars state that, while the surplus rural labor is viewed as the main "push factor", demand for labor can be regarded as the main "pull factor". Others contend that high unemployment rates in urban areas rejected this paradigm.

=== Income gap ===
Early in 1970, the Harris-Todaro model recognized that the persistent wage differential between urban and rural sectors is a main "pull" factor of migration in developing countries. In Zhu's study conducted in 2002, he presents a model of migration in his study and confirms the significance of the urban-rural income gap for migration decisions. Studies of Dr. Cai, Director of Institute of Population and Labor Economics, demonstrate that an increase of the ratio of local rural income to the average national rural income will reduce migration. Besides the huge rural-urban income gap, the regional income gap also drives internal migration in China. As noted by Zhao whose research interest mainly lies in labor economics, many migrants flow from the western region with low incomes to the eastern region with higher incomes.

=== Migrant networks ===
Migrant networks have a significant role in labor migration. Migrant networks are "sets of interpersonal ties that connect migrants, former migrants, and non-immigrants" through the ties of family members, friendships, and the overall community. The role is "particularly prominent in situations in which migration involves large informational or psychic costs, such as when moving to a completely different culture or environment or if the destination labor market is hostile to immigrants". China's migrants are heavily dependent on their migrant networks to assist them in finding jobs and houses, while also making sure they are financially stable. Migrant networks can reduce the cost of labor migration by providing job information and supportive relationships to the immigrants, as well as job search assistance. These networks can be described by the Chinese term Guanxi which "describes the basic dynamic in personalized networks of influence." Migrant workers can potentially find jobs at a restaurant or within the garment industry run by migrants from the same origins. In a study conducted by Liang and Morroka, whose research focuses on migration in China, they reported that female migrants are more likely to rely on the developed migration networks, while younger migrants and those with higher level of education are less likely to depend on the networks.

== Benefits and costs ==
=== Benefits ===
Rural women in particular were exposed to modern globalization of gender and cultural roles lived improved lives. Labor in China was greatly segregated by gender. Where typically young, beautiful women found jobs in the beauty industry and often found better wages and living quarters. Gaetano further explains that "women have had a virtual monopoly in urban domestic service and hotel and restaurant hospitality". While females took the hospitality industry, males found themselves in the low-skill, low-wage industrial jobs which includes construction-like jobs. Though the jobs held grueling hours, being paid and establishing an identity separate from their household was a huge benefit for many transient workers. Generally speaking, the difference in living standards between rural and urban workers was apparent where urban workers tended to live a more lavish lifestyle. This lavish lifestyle included better living quarters, nutrition, guanxi (social connections), and access to education. Education especially was a huge factor for the migration of families. Rural women were seeking to better educate their offspring in the hopes of better economic success for their children. As China shifts from export-driven growth to stimulating domestic demand, the consumption and investment potential brought by migrant workers will significantly boost long-term economic growth in Chinese cities.

=== Costs ===
With the benefits of migration comes the cost of migration for many transient workers. Even though traveling to a larger city with more opportunities appeared beneficial, in many instances migrants were treated harshly and viewed as second class citizens. Gao Yu, the China country director for the Landesa Rural Development Institute in Seattle stated that "Migrants who move with their children face a host of other challenges, including enrolling their children in school. Many schools regard prior education background as an important criterion and will not admit children educated in rural schools – often considered inferior." This quote suggests that many migrants and their children were seen as inferior in schools, as well as in many other public areas in China. Because many rural Chinese workers were making about $2 a day, they were forced to move to the city, causing an influx of migrant workers who were seeking better opportunities. In response, In the mid-1980s in China, in order to control migration rates, transient workers were required to carry personal identity cards, employment registration card, and a certificate of good health which often had high fees due to corruption and were many times denied by the Hukou system. At the time, migrants were seen as a nuisance to society and needed to be kept in check. However, in the mid-2000s attitudes towards migration drastically changed. In the book Out to work, Migration, Gender, and the Changing Lives of Rural Women in Contemporary China, Gaetano explained how "Migrants were finally recognized to be critical in narrowing the rural-urban income gap, as they redistribute wealth through remittances and apply new knowledge and skills to develop rural areas". Even though China recognized the importance of migrant workers, their "low levels of education, skills, and work experience, and their dearth of urban social connections, combined with the hukou-based job distribution" still created many disadvantages for rural migrants.

== Social impacts ==
=== Labor supply ===
In general, the current system of circular migration of floating populations in China offers greater labor resources to coastal areas of high economic activity, but "although labor productivity in migrant activities is higher than it is in local nonfarm sectors, the current economic cost of migration in China is so high as to significantly limit such reallocation. The current system therefore works to reduce the overall productivity of labor and causes a tremendous loss of social resources." In other words, research done by Yaohui Zhao at Beijing University indicates that while economic theory demonstrates labor migration to increase efficiency due to the reallocation of labor, the economic cost of migration actually mitigates gains in efficiency enough that internal migration under the Hukou system results in financial and social losses instead of gains.

A significant number of internal migrant workers, along with excess labor from the shrinking manufacturing work force, have transitioned to working in China's platform economy. China's platform economy has grown substantially since the early 2010s, with its transactional volume reaching RMB 3.7 trillion in 2021. As of 2020, 84 million people worked as platform economy service providers and 6 million were employees of platform companies.

=== Violations of labor standards ===
Violations of labor standards involve labor contracts, working conditions, wage payments and social insurance. The problems in terms of labor standards violations are rooted in institutional discrimination against migrant workers as well as inadequate law enforcement.

Low incidents of labor contracts are a main form of labor standards violations, which allows employers to further violate labor rights in many other aspects. According to a survey conducted by the Ministry of Urban and Rural Development, Ministry of Labor and Social Security and the All-China Federation of Trade Unions in 2004, only between 10% and 37.5% of the migrants working in the construction industry signed labor contracts. A recent research by the Jinan Daily demonstrates that eight out of ten migrant workers did not know what the labor contract was. Many employers thus take advantage of migrant workers' unawareness and do not fulfill their obligations to sign labor contracts.

The working condition is one manifest aspect of labor standards violations.The majority of migrants work more hours per day and more days per week than what is limited by labor law. The Chinese Household Income Project Survey of 2002 show that over 80% of migrants worked seven days per week, and only 7% workers' working time was in accordance with what law regulated. It also showed that around 33.3% of migrant workers worked 9 to 10 hours per day, about 25% 11 to 12 hours and 12% 13 or more hours per day. Safety is another concern regarding the working condition. The prevalence of migrant workers in dangerous jobs results in a high number of work-related illnesses, injuries and deaths. Migrant workers make up 80% of the deaths in mining, construction, and chemical factories. And about 90% of those suffering from work-related diseases are migrant workers.

In terms of wage payment, although labor law regulates a minimum wage, many employers either ignore the regulation or consider it to be the maximum wage. According to an article in China Daily in 2006, nearly 30% of migrant workers earned RMB 300 and 500 on average per month, nearly 40% between RMB 500 and 800 and about 28% more than RMB 800. Moreover, it is common for migrant workers not to receive their wage on time, due to the lack of protection of labor rights. The government has realized the seriousness of wage arrears and taken many measures to deal with this issue. The situation has been improved a lot, but overall the problem of wage arrears still exists. In 2006, around 10% of rural-urban migrant workers received their wages on average seven months late.

The limited access of migrant workers to social insurance highlights their vulnerability. A survey conducted by the Ministry of Agriculture in 2005 reports that only 13% of rural-urban migrant workers had insurance coverage for occupational injuries and diseases, only 10% for medical insurance and 15% for pension scheme. Another survey reports that migrant workers' participation in pension schemes was as high as 33.7%; medical care, 21.6%; unemployment insurance, 10.3%; employment injury insurance, 31.8%. The Chinese Academy of Social Sciences estimates that less than 5% got pension insurance and less than 3% of rural migrant laborers enjoyed unemployment insurance.

=== Class and inequality ===
As China experiences economic growth, the disparities between the affluent and the disadvantaged, as well as between urban and rural areas, continue to widen. At a group expert meeting of the United Nations in January 2008, a number of class-based implications of Chinese urban growth due to migration were identified, including "wage arrears, unfair compensation for land expropriated, urban poverty," issues of "public safety and social stability", and the potential creation of a "permanent urban underclass" of 200 million or more workers. Class inequality is commonly reflected in income differentials; "in urban China, urban resident annual earnings are 1.3 times larger than long-term rural migrant earnings as observed in a nationally represented sample in 2002." Additionally, migrant workers in China are generally excluded from the social services their local neighbors enjoy; "migrant workers' basic needs for housing, social security, and education for their children are not protected by the local government."

=== Health ===
The floating population of Chinese migrant workers "presents major public health challenges, especially in the provision of reproductive health care for migrant women and the need to address the increased risk to both sexes of infection with sexually transmitted diseases and HIV." A survey of migrant workers published in the journal "Public Health Reports" indicated that "forty-seven percent of the migrants were unwilling to make contributions to health insurance," and "poor living conditions and inattention to health may make migrants vulnerable to poor long-term health." Despite these health issues presented by the floating population, certain factors mitigate the health impact of internal migration in China. In a questionnaire administered to a variety of rural, urban, and migrant workers in Zhejiang Province, Eastern China, 2004, indicated that "Migrants had the best self-rated health and reported the least acute illness, chronic disease, and disability, after controlling for age and education." In light of this data, the researchers concluded that the migrants had zero HIV infections, and the migrant workers examined demonstrated the "healthy migrant effect". Despite this, migration still creates a negative effect on public health due to the lack of affordable health care.

==== Mental health ====
Historically, "migration has been associated with increased vulnerability to mental health problems," and this has prompted some research into the mental health status of China's hundreds of millions of rural-urban migrants. Research by scholars from Zhejiang University and the UCL Centre for International Health and Development has however revealed that "rural-urban migrant workers in this part of China are not especially vulnerable to poor mental health." They believe that this "may result from a sense of well being associated with upward economic mobility and improved opportunities, and the relatively high social capital in migrant communities." Thus, the "healthy migrant effect" also exhibits itself in the mental health of rural-urban migrants in China.

=== Gender ===
Migration in China has produced a number of important impacts with regard to gender and gender equality in modern China. This process, usually known as a 'transition', "has gendered consequences and differential implications for men and women." The men and women who partake in rural-urban labor migration are "channeled into gender-segregated jobs and that gender division of labor is increasingly becoming a dominant mode of household production in the countryside." According to research conducted by Youqin Huang and published in the journal Environment and Planning A, "the constraints of human capital, the patriarchal culture and the Household Registration (hukou). After the migration process, females "are at a disadvantage in the labour market not only because of their gender, but also because of their rural identities and outsider status." One way in which this may be seen is in the fact that women migrants "can only attain jobs with lower prestige than their male counterparts, such as agricultural work and a few gender-stereotyped, family-related urban jobs." Despite the disadvantages faced by female migrants in China, some research such as that conducted with data from Hubei Province demonstrates that "migration has enabled women to benefit from economic opportunities and provided them with a degree of freedom that was not possible at their places of origin." Currently, there is some scholarly agreement on the net effect of migration in China on women in particular, "female migrant workers are doubly disadvantaged in China's urban labor market because of their doubly marginalized identities as both women and rural residents."

=== Education ===
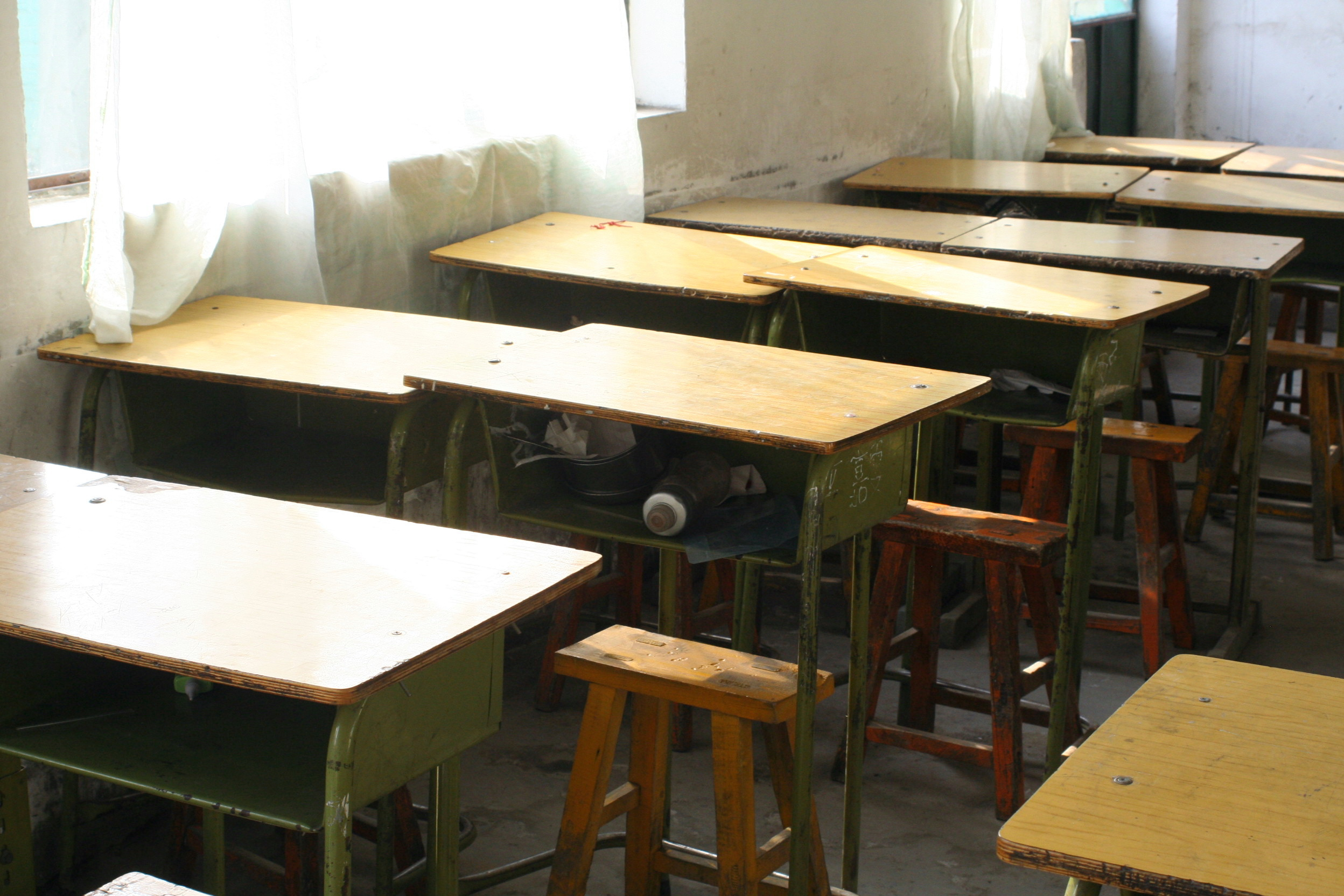
Classroom in a school for migrant students in Beijing (Dongba district).

According to a research conducted by Zai Liang and Yiu Por Chen and published in the journal "Social Science Research", "migration usually has negative consequences for children's schooling because of the loss of social capital in schools, neighborhood, and community of origin." In theory, migrant children can study in urban public schools, but access is usually limited. The main reason is that the education budget for compulsory education is allocated through local governments and strictly based on local hukou population. Many of the urban public schools with a limited education budget are consequently reluctant to accept migrant children.

One usual way for migrant children to study in urban public schools, which is distinct from usual admission procedure, is to pay "sponsorship" fees (zanzhu fei). The amount of such fees can be prohibitive for poor migrant parents, which impedes many migrant children to get enrolled in public schools. Up to now, there are some improvements in terms of access to urban public schools and some cities have banned "sponsorship" fees, but specific policy varies from city to city. A large portion of migrant children are still excluded from the urban public education system.

In response to the lack of access to public educational resources, migrants in some big cities began to set their own schools since the 1990s. These schools are known as migrant-sponsored schools (nongmingong zidi xuexiao). At the beginning, urban authorities refused to grant licenses and even closed down the schools. Although local governments did not need to be responsible for migrants' welfare, they should still be responsible for any accident such as the collapse of buildings or food poisoning that happened in the schools. These schools are usually less expensive with average tuition fees around 300 RMB per semester. According to Lu and Zhang's research conducted in Beijing in 2001, migrant-sponsored schools usually did not have licenses, high education quality, and adequate facilities. They, however, conclude that despite such disadvantages, these schools at least provided migrant children with basic education.

In addition to the issue of access to education, migrant children have to return to their places of their hukou origin to take The National College Entrance Examination. The entire school enrollment system in China is place-based and they can only pass certain examinations in their places of hukou origin. This leads to discrepancies between what migrant students have studied in urban areas and what they will be examined as textbooks in different cities and provinces can be quite different. Since 2016, Guangdong has relaxed its policies. A child of migrants can take Entrance Exam in Guangdong if he or she has attended 3 years of highschool in the province, and if the parent(s) have legal jobs and have paid for 3 years of social insurance in the province.

=== Left-behind children ===
Having both paternal grandparents able to provide child care support full-time is a critical resource for rural people; otherwise, childcare issues may constrain their labor migration prospects. Before the 2000s, few mothers questioned the caregiving practice of leaving children in the care of older relatives while they migrated for work prospects.

Left-behind children in China refer to the children who live with one parent (usually mother) or extended family (usually grandparents) when their parent(s) is (are) absent from home as migrant workers in urban areas. They are left behind partly because of little access to basic welfare in cities without local hukou status and partly because of high living expenses in cities. According to Ministry of Education, in 2012 there were more than 12.6 million migrant children and 58 million left-behind children from 7 years old to 16 years old. Left-behind children will have more health, emotional and behavior issues than those who grow up with their parents.

Left-behind children are generally less healthy, but the difference is very marginal. A study conducted by several professors from Chinese University of Hong Kong reports that left-behind children are more likely to have a less healthy diet and lower rates of physical activity. In terms of nutrition, left-behind children face more nutrition problems such as low intake of some nutrients and poor physical development related to nutrition. Further, many studies find that left-behind children are more likely to have a smoking habit, compared to children with no migrant parents. Primary causes include insufficient public awareness and lack of health education programs. Weak implementation of related regulations in rural areas such as prohibition to sell cigarettes to children under 18 may also contribute to this unsatisfying situation.

Left-behind children are also prone to undergo emotional and psychological problems. Liang's study of 250 left-behind junior high school students suggests that 16.6% of them felt abandoned, 12.3% had problems expressing difficulties, and 6.5% felt "anguished" when being left behind. In addition, the earlier those children are separated from parents, more symptoms of depression and anxiety will be reported.

Moreover, various studies indicate that left-behind children are more likely to have behavioral problems. Qualitative observations indicate that left-behind children often behavior extremely, either withdrawn or excessively aggressive. It has also been reported that left-behind children tend to be "indifferent, introverted, inferior" and "selfish".

The problems noted above are mainly due to the fact that the grandparents either spoil the children or fail to give them enough emotional support. Physical weakness and low education levels of grandparents who take care of left-behind children also contribute to the problems.

Comparative studies show that left-behind children's situation is not much worse than that of those living with parents in the same area. On the one hand, the institutions (e.g. the hukou system) that maintain the urban-rural inequality should be modified so that more migrants can settle down in cities with families. On the other hand, public resources in rural communities should be improved and regional inequality should be further reduced.

=== Social security ===
Migrant workers and "flexible" employees can also join the social security system for urban workers; they must have a labor relationship with an employer or contribute at a specified rate.

== Policy theories ==
Scholars from a wide variety of fields have recommended policy changes in order to deal with the social issues created by floating populations of migrant workers in China. Some scholars believe that "public policies reducing the cost (including the opportunity cost) of education for rural people could help filling the endowment gap between rural migrants and urban residents in the labor market." Additionally, scholars have recommended that "new policy initiatives concerning the issue of education and migrant children are sorely needed." Public health scholars recommend that "because health insurance schemes will remain limited for the foreseeable future, attention should focus on providing affordable health care to both uninsured migrants and the urban poor." In light of the migrant worker Foxconn suicides, labor scholars have recommended that "the government should redistribute income and guarantee benefits to rural residents and migrant workers to improve living standards." Those studying labor mobility believe that "the artificial restrictions under which rural-urban migrants work in the cities, i.e. the prohibition on or impediments to urban settlement, restricted access to skilled jobs, and the system of short-term contracts, may have generated an excessively high migrant mobility rate."

=== Health policy ===
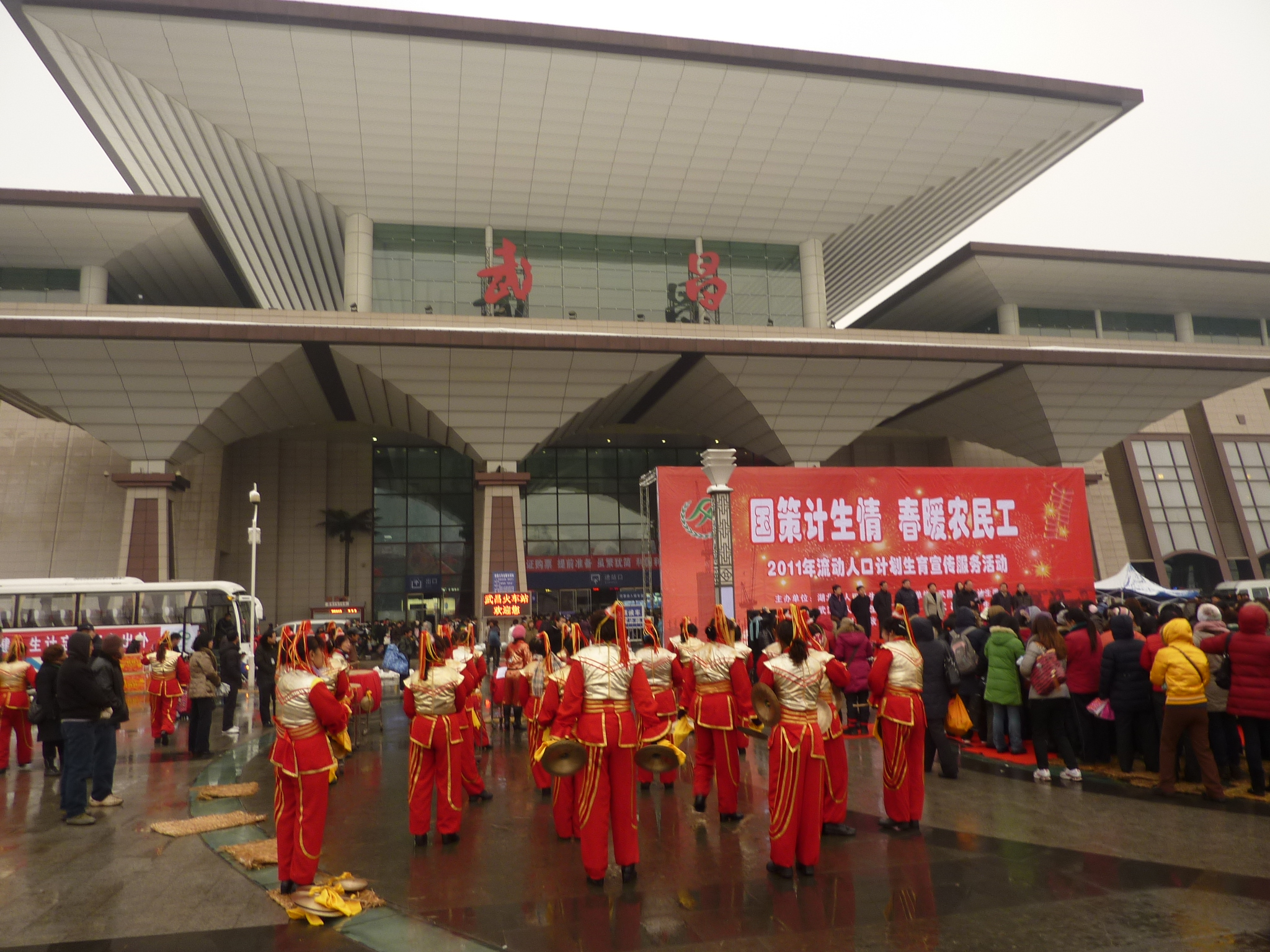
A family planning publicity event for migrant population (流动人口计划生育宣传服务活动) at the Wuchang Railway Station. January 2011.

The issue of internal migration and health in China is intricately linked with the health policies national and local level governments enforce. "Policy toward rural-urban migration in China has undergone a significant shift in the last decade, and improving the working and living conditions and access to health care of migrant workers in cities is now clearly on the agenda of national and local governments. Nonetheless, migrants' mobility and their concentration in hazardous industries continue to make it difficult to reduce their exposure to environmental and occupational health risks and to ensure their access to affordable care." In order to further improve the "living conditions and access to health care of migrant workers in cities," a number of scholars have recently provided policy recommendations.

In general, public health scholars recommend that "because health insurance schemes will remain limited for the foreseeable future, attention should focus on providing affordable health care to both uninsured migrants and the urban poor." In light of this recommendation, further research has been conducted in order to assess the status of internal migration and health in China, as well as to provide more specific policy recommendations in order to address any issues. Research conducted by a team from Beijing Normal University and the Institute of Development Studies has provided a number of specific recommendations for policy makers. In a journal article published in The Lancet, this team voiced three primary concerns regarding the health of migrants in China. These concerns consisted of the spread of communicable and infectious disease, migrant maternal health, and occupational disease and injuries such as silicosis, chemical poisoning, and industrial machinery accidents. Beyond these three primary concerns, the researchers advise policy makers and public health officials to pay more attention to two additional issues. The first of these is mental and behavioural health, which is a "domain that is understudied in China". The second issue they discuss is that of risk perception. Little is known about how migrants perceive the "various possibilities for health care: self-medication, informal healers, traditional medicine, private clinics with varied levels of care, and more formal hospital treatment." Research into risk perception will "be crucial to prevention, intervention, and other health-related measures for the migrant population in China.

=== Labor policy ===
Two landmark policy documents regarding migrant workers were issued in 2002 and 2003, named Document Number 2 of 2002 and Document Number 1 of 2003.These two documents initialized the process of elimination of labor market discrimination against migrant workers and legitimization of them. In addition, the 2002 Work Safety Law and the Law on the Prevention and Cure of Occupational Diseases demanded that all employers must guarantee a safe working environment for all employees. In 2004, employers in high-risk industries such as mining and construction were required to cover injury insurance for migrant workers. In the 2005 Government Work Report, Premier Wen Jiabao noted that the payment of migrant workers should not be delayed. In March 2006, the State Council called for the establishment of a system that monitored wage delivery to migrant workers. In June 2006, the State Council passed a series of measures to protect migrant workers' labor rights, following up Circular No. 36. The measures include the restriction of minimum wages, solutions to wage defaults, enforcement of labor contracts and enlargement of migrant workers' social security coverage. With the government's continuous efforts, the situation of migrant workers have been improved, though still varying from province to province. In 2005, 80% of migrant workers had been fully paid. In Shanghai, more than two million migrant workers are in a special social security program.

=== Education policy ===
Early in 2003, China has issued an announcement on migration management and pays much attention on migrant children's education. The government mainly focused on possible financial reform, encouraged public schools to admit more migrant children, forbade extra fees and sponsored migrant-sponsored schools. The announcement noted equal access to education, elimination of sponsorship fees and the government funding for migrant-sponsored schools. In September 2003, a joint directive declared that urban governments and public schools should be responsible for migrant children's equal access to education.

Although there are various policies related to migrant children's education, in Hu's doctoral thesis, he addresses that the policy is partially implemented and the situation varies from province to province. Policy regarding funding is not being effectively implemented. Public schools do not have enough funding and subsequently school access is still limited. In addition, migrant parents need to present a series of certificates showing that they have stable jobs and accommodation in cities in order to get their children admitted in public schools.

=== Hukou reform ===
The Chinese government has committed to eliminating institutional discrimination of migrant workers on the grounds of hukou system. But the reform is complicated since it involves restructuring political and social systems, which will impact every aspect including employment, social security and property rights.

The objective of the reform is to merge urban and rural hukou systems into one in which migrant workers can have equal access to public resources as urban residents do. At the beginning of the New Millennium, Fujian, Liaoning and Shandong Provinces abolished the dual-type hukou system and issued identical hukou status to both urban and rural residents. Up to 2008, twelve provinces had abolished the dual urban-rural hukou system. Due to the complication of this issue, however, it is still very difficult for migrant workers to gain access to social welfare in urban areas, though with a hukou reform. For example, some cities such as Zhengzhou once opened public schools to rural migrant children in 2002, but these cities soon realized that there were not enough schools for the large number of migrant children. According to China Daily, Huang Ming, vice-minister of public security, addressed that the national hukou reform would be done by 2020. He said in the interview that the new hukou system would gradually extend pension, education and health care services to qualified residents, both urban and rural.

China's hukou system is a social management system. This system links every Chinese resident with their birthplace. One can only access their health care, pension and education for their children in their birth city. Cai Fang, director of the Institute of Population Studies at the Chinese Academy of Social Sciences, stated that migrant workers do not have the same benefits as the urban residents. As a result of unequal benefits the migrant workers have limited participation in the labor market. Mr Cai estimates that more than 200 million migrant workers can't participate fully in the labor market due to the limitations from the Chinese hukou system.

== Sources and destinations ==
=== Internal migration ===
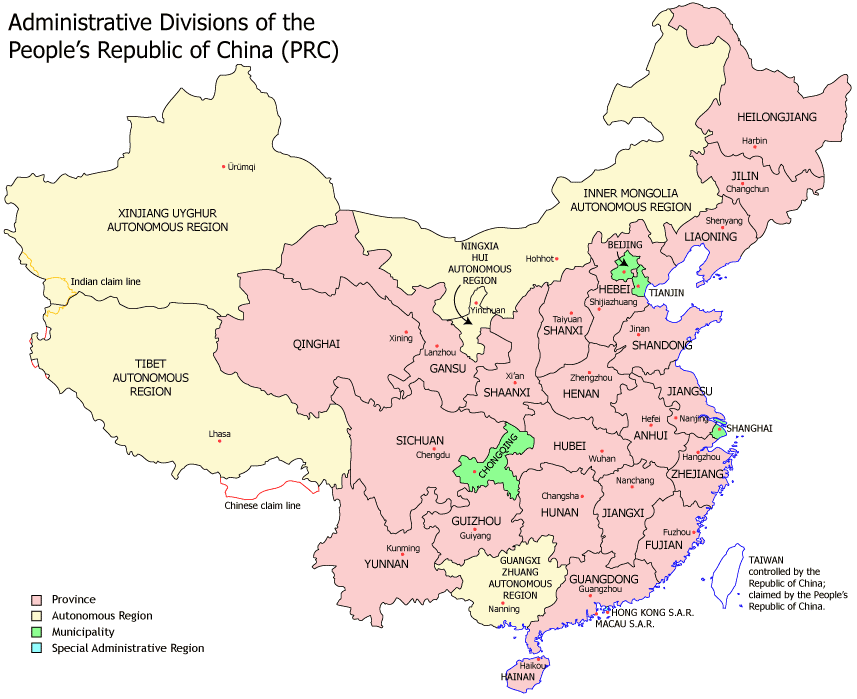
Map showing the various administrative divisions of the People's Republic of China.

According to the International Labour Organization, internal migration in China is defined by two essential features. The first of these is that migrants generally move from farmlands and agricultural areas into more urban areas and developed cities. The second defining feature of Chinese internal migration is that "labour flows are basically directed from the interior to coastal areas, and/or from central and western regions to eastern areas." These are not independent characteristics; "These two features overlap, and are closely interrelated with the macro socio-economic structure.

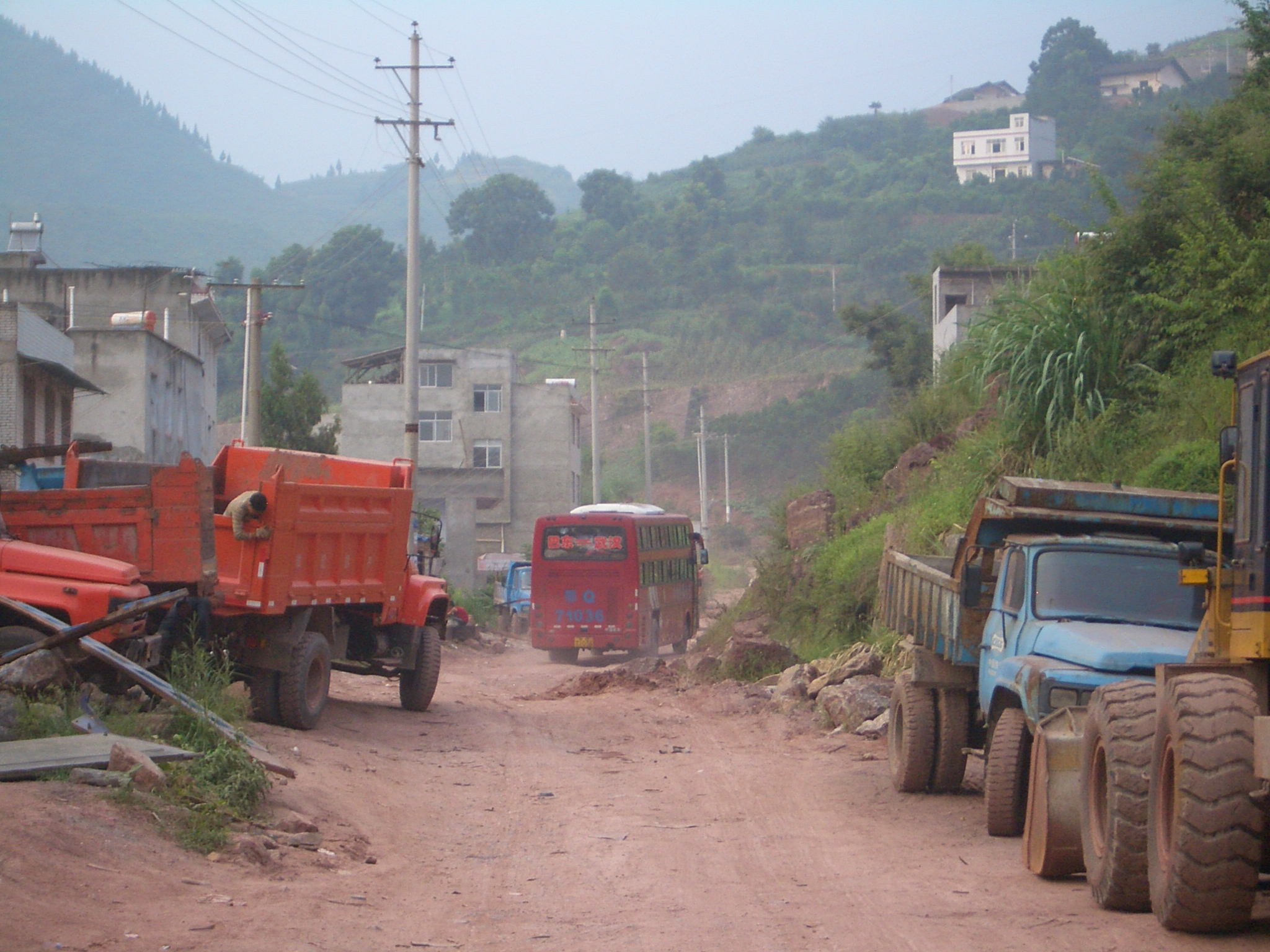
Migrants leaving Badong in mostly rural western Hubei for the provincial capital Wuhan with an overnight bus have to brave the rigors of Highway G209.

The Fifth National Population Census of the People's Republic of China in 2000 counted 42.4 million people living outside of their home provinces (i.e., outside of the province where they were legally domiciled). These would include e.g. migrant workers, students on campuses away from home, but not the military (who, generally, are counted separately from the provinces' and municipalities' populations). The largest migrant population was found in Guangdong (15.0 mln). The rest of China's southeastern seaboard attracted plenty of migrants as well (Shanghai (3.1 mln), Jiangsu (2.5 mln), Zhejiang (2.0 mln), Fujian (2.1 mln)); Beijing had 2.5 million. The coastal Liaoning and Shandong, as well as the inland Yunnan and Xinjiang had over a million migrants each.

Migrants originated mostly in the inland provinces, such as Anhui (4.3 mln), Jiangxi (3.7 mln), Henan (3.1 mln), Hunan (4.3 mln), Hubei (2.8 mln), Guangxi (2.4 mln), Sichuan (6.9 mln).

Much of the interprovincial migration was toward the neighboring wealthier provinces or municipalities if there was one. E.g., over 90% of the Guangxi migrants went to the nearby Guangdong, while over 60% of Hebei migrants went to the Beijing and Tianjin municipalities (which both are surrounded by Hebei's territory). On the other hand, among the Hubei migrants about one half went to Guangdong, and the rest mostly to various other coastal destinations, from Beijing to Fujian.

It is of interest to the Chinese government to control the flow of internal migration in China. However, the flow of migration is large and widespread enough to be difficult for the government to manage. "Despite the Chinese government's policy of encouraging the development of western regions of the country, China's coastal regions, and especially the province of Guangdong, experienced the largest increase in the size of the floating population. With less than 7 percent of China's population, Guangdong has 27 percent of China's floating population. The size of the floating population in Guangdong nearly tripled between the 1990 and the 2000 censuses." Such uneven migration can hamper the government's policy to encourage the development of non-coastal regions, which exacerbates the geographic inequality in the country.

=== Migration from neighboring countries ===
==== Vietnam ====
China accepted 260,000 Vietnamese through the Orderly Departure Program although this participation is less well known than that of other countries. The Chinese government accorded the Vietnamese protection by providing them refugee status. Most refugees settled in southern China. During the time of the refugees' integration, the Chinese government charged various agencies with examining the refugees' background and labor skills to facilitate job placement. Following the end of the Orderly Departure Program in 1997, China continued to receive refugees although in much fewer numbers. Prior to the end of the Program and after the fall of the Soviet Union in 1991, Vietnamese refugees to China had already been decreasing in number.

==== North Korea ====
UNHCR has declared all North Koreans in China to be 'persons of concern', although China does not recognize North Koreans' claims to asylum as valid. China refuses to accept people who the country views as defectors from other Communist countries. As a result, China identifies North Koreans within its borders as "economic migrants". Because of the Government of China does not provide assistance to migrants, the UNHCR established an office in Beijing in 1995 to provide direct assistance including food, shelter, health, education, and social services. Later, China banned the UNHCR direct access to North Koreans, claiming that the issue was an internal matter and should be treated as such. Today, advocates for North Korean defectors lobby to government officials to reverse legal jargon.

== See also ==
- Demographics of China
- History of migration to Sichuan
- Economy of China
- Filipinos in China
- Hukou
- Koreans in China
- Metropolitan regions of China
- Urbanization in China
- China Labour Bulletin
- Globalization
- Migrant worker
- Guanxi
- Gender inequality in China
