= Migrant School =

Type of school for migrant students in China

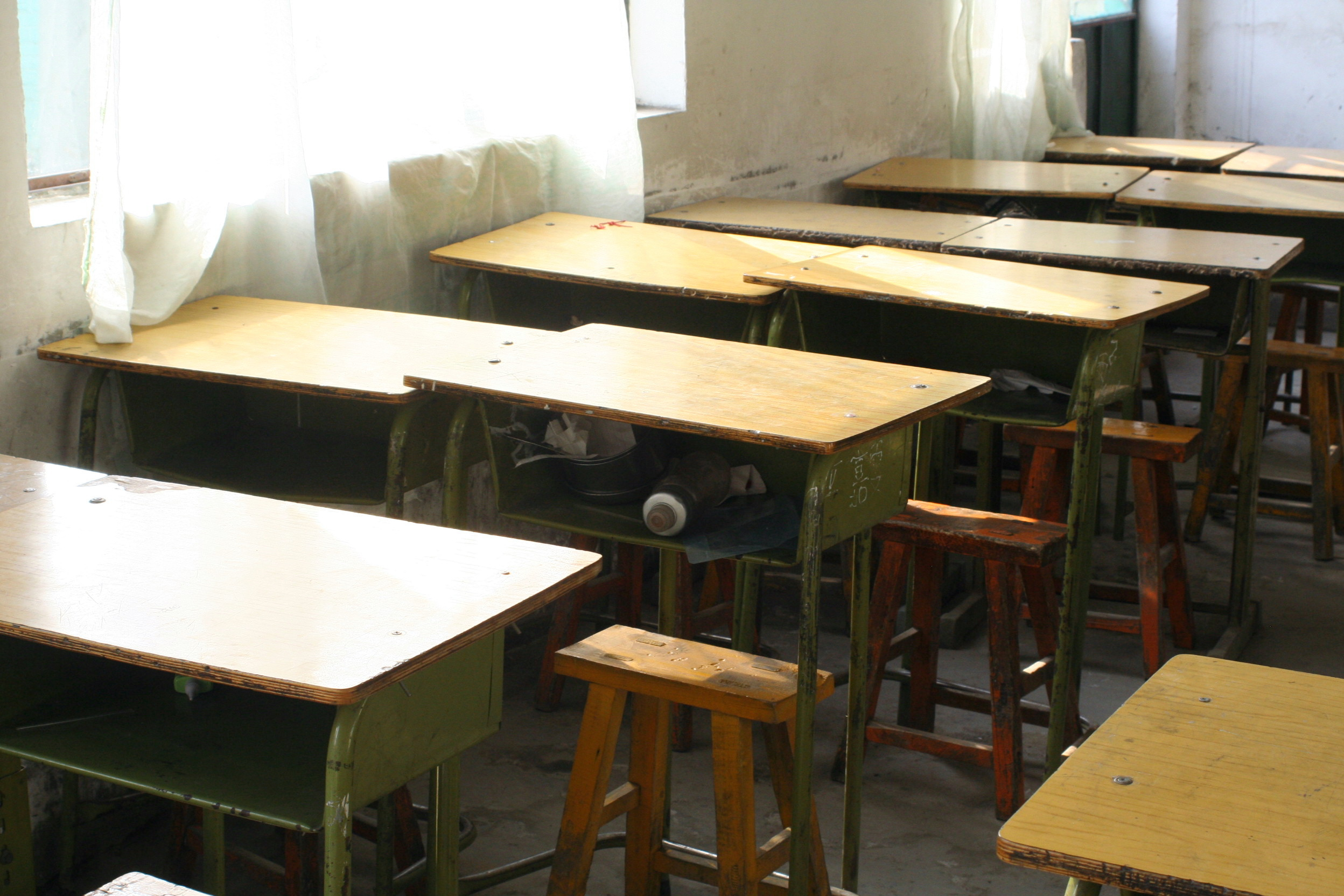
Classroom at a Migrant School in Beijing.

Migrant Schools (simplified Chinese: 农民工子弟学校; traditional Chinese: 農民工子弟學校) are educational institutions established to serve the children of rural migrant workers in urban areas. Migrant Schools emerged due to the hukou system preventing migrant children from easily accessing public education. In recent years, restrictions on hukou-based admissions have been relaxed, but not without maintaining severe barriers to education for migrant children.

In exchange for low enrolment fees, migrant school students commonly endure deplorable sanitary, security, and classroom conditions. Substandard quality of education is also a major issue within migrant schools, with children that attend placing much lower in standardized testing in relation to their peers enrolled in public institutions. Additionally, since most of these substandard schools lack legal status, they are unable to issue certificates for courses completed, creating significant issues for students wishing to re-enter state schools within their hukou, or have their education validated for employment purposes. Operating outside state control, these schools are frequently banned and demolished, often without the authorities ensuring the children are placed in other schools. While some Migrant Schools have since been taken over and "improved" by local governments, they generally still offer lower quality education compared to standard public schools.

== History and Legal Framework ==
As put forth in 1986, The Compulsory Education Law in China mandates that all children receive nine years of schooling. It stipulates that “the state, community, schools, and families shall safeguard the right of compulsory education of school-age children and adolescents.” However, in practice, the state has not ensured unrestricted access to public education for all migrant children, therefore causing an eruption of unlicensed Migrant Schools. The central government first recognized the need for migrant children to receive an education as an imperative in 1998. Prior to this recognition, migrant children were entirely excluded from the urban public education system. Legislation passed in 1998 granted them the right to temporarily enrol in urban public schools under the condition that their families registered with multiple administrative agencies and paid "Temporary Enrolment Fees," which could amount to several thousand yuan per year.

In May 2001, the State Council issued a Decision on the Reform and Development of Basic Education, highlighting the importance of prioritizing the admission migrant children to public schools. However, this document did not address the issue of temporary enrolment fees; a longstanding barrier for low-income rural families. In August 2002, the Ministry of Education held a session focused on private schools, urging local governments to better manage and support these schools. The magnitude in which these efforts were perceived were largely symbolic and lacked enforceable directives, resulting in minimal impact. Migrant Schools proliferated in Beijing in the late 1990s and early 2000s alongside the mass influx of economic migrants in search for affordable schools for their children within the areas in which they worked. During this period, private-run Migrant Schools operated in a "gray area" of the law, and relied on local governments’ tolerance to expand. At the end of 2002, 350 migrant schools were open in Beijing.

Authorities in Beijing began looking more closely at migrant schools in 2003 in the wake of a new law. In September 2003, the State Council released a more detailed document stating that destination city governments (like Beijing) would be responsible for the nine-year compulsory education of migrant workers' children. It was stipulated that migrant children's education should be integrated into the cities' overall social development plans, and that public schools should receive more funds to accommodate them. Between 2003 and 2006, a number of migrant schools found to not meet official standards for education were shut down, while 63 "qualified" migrant schools were licensed and given legal status. However, the regulator's attitude toward migrant schools swiftly changed, and no new licenses were issued. Other institutions awaiting permits were left in limbo, according to migrant school admin.

== Current Statistics ==
According to the 2022 Statistical Bulletin for National Education Development, migrant children accounted for 13.6 million of the students in compulsory education across China. Of these, 9.7 million were enrolled in primary schools, and 3.9 million in middle schools. The National Bureau of Statistics (NBS) Migrant Workers Report for 2022 indicated that 88.3 percent of primary school-age migrant children and 87.8 percent of middle school-age migrant children were enrolled in public schools. This data implies that approximately 1.13 million primary school-age migrant children and about 481,000 middle school-age migrant children were not attending public schools. Implied data pertaining to unenrolled migrant children is speculated to be much higher due to the lack of documentation held by many migrant children moving from rural to urban hukous.

== Challenges Migrant Children Face in Accessing Education ==
To secure a place for their child at a public school, migrant parents often face numerous obstacles imposed by local education departments, especially in major cities that guard their educational resources closely. For instance migrant families are typically required to provide a plethora of documentation and certifications to access schooling for their children, which serve as barriers for many. These include temporary residence permits, work permits, proof of residence, certificates from their place of origin, and household registration booklets. Those who do manage to secure places in public schools often encounter prejudice and discrimination, being excluded from extracurricular activities and treated as outsiders.

The last public data on access to education from the 2020 NBS survey on migrant workers revealed that only 81.5 percent of migrant children in the compulsory school-age range had access to public schools in cities, a decline of 1.9 percent compared with the previous year. Nearly half (47.5 percent) of the migrant workers surveyed reported issues related to their children's schooling, including difficulties in finding a school, paying fees, and leaving children unattended. Although the attendance rate in kindergarten for migrant worker children was rather high at 86.1 percent, most kindergartens are private, paid institutions with limited services.

== Migrant School Closures ==
Migrant schools in major cities like Beijing frequently face the threat of closure by government officials. Local authorities have launched numerous campaigns over the last decade to crack down on unlicensed migrant schools, often citing safety concerns and issues with proper licensing. However, many schools that were demolished had passed multiple government inspections, and the true motive for closures often involved clearing land for new commercial and housing developments.

In August 2011, just weeks before the beginning of the school year in Beijing, local officials abruptly ordered the closure of 24 schools for migrant children in the Haidian, Chaoyang, and Daxing districts. The closures were justified by authorities citing the schools' failure to meet official standards for construction, sports facilities, and safety regulations. Migrant school administrators disputed the closures by citing their inability to meet official standards due to the complete absence of funding and support by the government. Local officials stated that the tens of thousands of children losing access to their migrant schools were welcome to be accepted into government run Beijing school systems, but failed to provide any information or insight to migrant families following the abrupt closures. Despite Dongba Experimental School in Chaoyang District addressing some of the issues raised by education officials, it, along with the other schools, were not permitted to reopen. Many migrants affected by these closures believe this to be a method of reducing the burgeoning of migrants within Beijing, leading many migrant children to be separated from their parents, and forced to return to their rural homesteads.

In 2017, Beijing ordered the relocation of Beijing Huangzhuang School, one of the largest migrant schools with about 2,000 students, to make way for development projects. Demolition work began in October 2017, just before the 19th Party Congress, leaving many migrant children with no choice but to opt for education opportunities even further away than they were once previously, or to return to their rural homesteads, away from their parents.

== See also ==
- Mingong
