= Native American Languages Act =

Civil rights law of the United States

Native American Languages Act of 1990
- Long title: An Act to reauthorize the Tribally Controlled Community College Assistance Act of 1978 and the Navajo Community College Act.
- Acronyms (colloquial): NALA
- Nicknames: Native American Languages Act
- Enacted by: the 101st United States Congress
- Effective: October 30, 1990

Citations
- Public law: 101-477
- Statutes at Large: 104 Stat. 1152

Codification
- Titles amended: 25 U.S.C.: Indians
- U.S.C. sections created: 25 U.S.C. ch. 31 § 2901 et seq.
- U.S.C. sections amended: 25 U.S.C. ch. 20, subch. I § 1811; 25 U.S.C. ch. 20, subch. II § 1832 et seq.

Legislative history
- Introduced in the Senate as S. 2167 by John McCain (R–AZ) on February 22, 1990; Committee consideration by Senate Indian Affairs (Permanent Select); Passed the Senate on October 11, 1990 (passed voice vote); Passed the House on October 12, 1990 (passed without objection); Signed into law by President George H. W. Bush on October 30, 1990

Major amendments
- Durbin Feeling Native American Languages Act of 2022

The Native American Languages Act of 1990 (NALA) is a US statute that gives historical importance as repudiating past policies of eradicating indigenous languages of the Americas by declaring as policy that Native Americans were entitled to use their own languages. The fundamental basis of the policy's declaration was that the United States "declares to preserve, protect and promote the rights and freedom of Native Americans to use practice and develop Native American Languages".

In addition, to "fully recognize the right of Indian Tribes and other Native American governing bodies, States, territories, and possessions of the United States to take action on, and give official status to their Native American languages for the purpose of conducting their own business".

== Provisions ==
SEC. 104. It is the policy of the United States to—

(1) preserve, protect, and promote the rights and freedom of Native Americans to use, practice, and develop Native American languages;
(2) allow exceptions to teacher certification requirements for Federal programs, and programs funded in whole or in part by the Federal Government, for instruction in Native American languages when such teacher certification requirements hinder the employment of qualified teachers who teach in Native American languages, and to encourage State and territorial governments to make similar exceptions;
(3) encourage and support the use of Native American languages as a medium of instruction in order to encourage and support—
(A) Native American language survival,
(B) educational opportunity,
(C) increased student success and performance,
(D) increased student awareness and knowledge of their culture and history, and
(E) increased student and community pride;
(4) encourage State and local education programs to work with Native American parents, educator, Indian tribes, and other Native American governing bodies in the implementation of programs to put this policy into effect;
(5) recognize the right of Indian tribes and other Native American governing bodies to use the Native American languages as a medium of instruction in all schools funded by the Secretary of the Interior;
(6) fully recognize the inherent right of Indian tribes and other Native American governing bodies, States, territories, and possessions of the United States to take action on, and give official status to, their Native American languages for the purpose of conducting their own business;
(7) support the granting of comparable proficiency achieved through course work in a Native American language the same academic credit as comparable proficiency achieved through course work in a foreign language, with recognition of such Native American language proficiency by institutions of higher education as fulfilling foreign language entrance or degree requirements; and
(8) encourage all institutions of elementary, secondary and higher education, where appropriate, to include Native American languages in the curriculum

in the same manner as foreign languages and to grant proficiency in Native American languages the same full academic credit as proficiency in foreign languages.

— Section 104, Native American Languages Act

== History ==
In the United States, Native American languages came under pressure through contact with superstrate colonial languages with the arrival of the first European settlers. Estimates place the number of Native languages at the time of European contact between three and six hundred.

=== Assimilation ===
Legislation mandated English as the exclusive language of instruction enforced on reservations in the 19th century. The Civilization Fund Act of 1819 authorized allotted funds to organizations such as missionaries and agents and employees of the Federal Government to live among the Indians in order to educate and assimilate the Indian people into the standards of Anglo-American society. As the foreign culture became more dominant, racial overtones surfaced.

Beginning in the late 19th century after the Indian Wars, the federal government established Native American boarding schools to educate and assimilate Native American children into mainstream culture. Multiple government officials and observers believed that native cultures were fading and they had an obligation to prepare native children for the future. But, Indian children were removed from their homes, and placed in distant boarding schools, often with children from other tribes. The federal government often operated the schools through religious organizations, both Protestant and Catholic. The children were required to learn English and practice Christianity, being forced at the schools to leave their native cultures. A number of emotional and psychological issues today found in Indian communities have their foundations within the traumatic experiences of the children educated in such schools.

The Dawes Allotment Act (1887) was intended to achieve assimilation in another way, by breaking up communal lands and tribal government on reservations. Communal land was distributed to registered heads of households in an effort to have the Indians establish subsistence farming, the standard among Euro-American farms at the time. They were to become private land owners. This change disrupted the communal life on multiple reservations. The 160-acre plots were generally too small for successful farming on the Great Plains because of geographic and climate conditions. In addition, outsiders soon tried to acquire Indian lands, and the tribes lost much of their property over the ensuing decades. A number of non-Indian men married Indian women in an effort to take over their land and property.

Similar actions had taken place in the Spanish colonies in the Americas. During early colonization non-Indian explorers married Indian women in Alta California and New Spain in order to be granted land by the Crown.

=== Recognition ===
It was not until the Civil Rights Movement that there began to be found traces of recognition and cultural revitalization. This started with President Johnson's approval of the Bilingual Education Act of 1968. This Act was primarily an outgrowth within the Civil Rights Movement and it was to assist particularly minorities speaking Spanish in English schools to help students with English. Yet, Bilingual Education was expanded with the Lau v. Nichols case. Lau reflects the now-widely accepted view that a person's language is so closely intertwined with their national origin (the country someone or their ancestors came from) that language-based discrimination is effectively a proxy for national origin discrimination. Though this act was aimed towards immigrant students, Native Americans took the opportunity to apply for funding to initiate projects for their own bilingual studies addressing their own language. Subsequent reform initiated by the Nixon administration during the Self-Determination Era gave back some sovereign power to tribes within self governance, with choices as to what federal programs to apply for funding for schools and health programs. In the wake of the Self-Determination Era, tribes and U.S. territorial communities were coming together to re-establish their cultures and language.

=== Executive Order ===
In 1974, the Native American Programs Act was enacted as Title VIII of the Economic Opportunity Act of 1964, to promote the goal of social and economic self-sufficiency for American Indians, Alaska Natives, Native Hawaiians, and Native American Pacific Islanders through programs and projects that:

1. Advance locally developed social and economic development strategies (SEDS) and strengthen local governance capabilities as authorized by Sec. 803(a);
2. Preserve Native American languages authorized by Sec. 803C;
3. Improve the capability of the governing body of the Indian tribe to regulate environmental quality authorized by Sec. 803(d); and
4. Mitigate the environmental impacts to Indian lands due to Department of Defense activities.

Communities who were re-establishing their cultures sought support through these programs. In response to the language decline in Native American communities and also responding to English-only attempts a powerful grass roots movement was initiated in 1988 at the International Conference at the Native Languages Issues Institute. The conference produced a resolution that found its way to Senator Daniel K. Inouye, chair of the senate select committee of Indian Affairs. Two years later it became the Native American Languages Act which officially addresses the fundamental rights of Native American peoples.

== Political figures/groups ==
The Act's provisions came from the International Native American Language conference with most of the texts drawn from a resolution adopted by the Hawaiian Legislature in 1987, which addressed Congress to enact legislation in support of Native American Languages. The founders of 'Aha Punana Leo, an educational program revitalizing the Hawaiian language, William Wilson, Chair of Hawaiian Studies at Hilo and his wife Kauanoe Kamanā, were the major players whose efforts affected the Hawaiian resolution. Their advocacy to change national policy was joined by American Indian language advocates. In 1988 Senator Daniel K. Inouye introduced a joint resolution, but Congress adjourned without any action.

The following year Inouye introduced a revised version (S. 1781) with nine sponsors, but the Bush administration opposed it because of the funding costs. Inouye revised the bill regarding the administrative concerns and was approved by the Senate on April 3, 1990, and sent to the House of Representatives ". Key members of the House refused to allow the bill out of the committee because of the use of languages other than English in America. Lurline Wailana McGregor, Inouye's aide and manager of the bill looked for a bill with a title that did not mention the word 'language' in it. A bill that Robert D. Arnold, on the professional staff of the U.S. Senate Committee on Indian Affairs, who was managing a bill met the requirements. Inouye took the bill to the floor and offered an amendment with the text of his Native American Language Bill. It was approved by the Senate and later concurred by the House. The billed signed by Bush was titled "Tribally Controlled and Navajo Community Colleges, Reauthorizations," on October 30, 1990, and he was also approving Title 1, the Native American Languages Act of 1990.

== Amendments ==
President George H. W. Bush signed the Native American Languages Act of 1992 on October 26, "to assist Native Americans in assuring the survival and continuing vitality of their languages". Prior legislation that was address and amended with this law was the Navajo Community College Act, which was legislation concerning the grants to the Navajo Nation "to assist the tribe in the construction, maintenance, and operation of Dine' College". However, the president did express the following legal concern:

I am concerned, however, about provisions in this bill that provide benefits to "Native Hawaiians" as defined in a race-based fashion. This race-based classification cannot be supported as an exercise of the constitutional authority granted to the Congress to benefit Native Americans as members of tribes. In addition, the terms "Native American Pacific Islanders" and "Indian organizations in urban or rural non-reservation areas" are not defined with sufficient clarity to determine whether they are based on racial classifications. Therefore, I direct the affected Cabinet Secretaries to consult with the Attorney General in order to resolve these issues in a constitutional manner.

In spite of testimony and support of tribal representatives, linguists, language groups and national organizations, Dominic Mastraquapa opposed the bill by saying that funding was adequate. Yet, no grants in the fiscal year of 1991 included language components. U.S. English support encouraged Inouye to present a substitution of the bill". The new provisions encouraged tribal governments to establish partnerships with schools, colleges, and universities. Grant funds would be used for recording equipment and computers for languages programs. Passed unanimously in the Senate, the bill went on to the Committee on Education and Labor. Harris Fawell of Chicago opposed the passage of the bill. Even with provisions to increase local match funding of 10 to 20%, Fawell refused to allow the bill to go to the House. Hawaiians and language institutes and advocates were alerted and Fawell's phone received more phone calls from Indians and other Native Americans than all the terms he held in Congress. He was known to say "Please call off the troops, we'll let the bill move".

== Effects ==
Congress found convincing evidence that student achievement and performance, community and school pride, and educational opportunity are clearly and directly tied to respect for, and support of, the first language of the child.

The Native American Language Act of 1990 has been a counterbalance to the English only movement and has been the catalyst for bilingual education on the reservations. Jon Reyhner had stated:

The Native American Languages Act of 1990 is the American Indian's answer to the English-only movement, and the Act's bilingual/multicultural educational approach is supported by the dismal historical record of assimilationist approaches to Indian education in the United States.

Funders such as the Endangered Language Fund (ELF) have helped start up pilot programs and advocates such as Advocates for Indigenous California Language Survival have helped to create language nests, and immersion programs. The Blackfeet Piegan Institute and the Aha Punana Leo program are examples of this movement.

From 2007–2012, funding for language instruction in public schools has been made available through the Esther Martinez Native American Languages Preservation Act, signed by President George W. Bush on December 14, 2006, to prevent the loss of heritage and culture. "Since 2000, 390 grants have been awarded under the program for a total of nearly $50 million to help preserve Native languages through language immersion programs." As of Sept. 2012, the New Mexico Congressional delegation has introduced a bill to renew the funding.

== Reauthorization ==
Sen. Lisa Murkowski, R-Alaska and Sen. Tim Johnson, D-South Dakota, introduced the Native American Languages Reauthorization Act of 2014 on May 5, 2014. The full name is "S.2299 - A bill to amend the Native American Programs Act of 1974 to reauthorize a provision to ensure the survival and continuing vitality of Native American languages". Other supporters include Senator John Walsh (D-Montana).

== See also ==
- Endangered Language Fund
- Esther Martinez Native American Languages Preservation Act
- Native Language Immersion Student Achievement Act
- Language policy
- Language revitalization
