= Esther Martinez Native American Languages Preservation Act =

United States law

The Esther Martinez Native American Languages Preservation Act funds programs that work "to preserve Native American languages." It is named for Esther Martinez, a teacher and storyteller who lived to be 94 years old, and was nationally known for her dedication to preserving the Tewa language. "She was killed in a car accident on September 18, [2006], just days after receiving a National Heritage Fellowship award for her efforts to preserve the Tewa language."

The Voice of America featured a four-part series in September 2012 "on keeping traditions alive", reporting:

"United States Representative Heather Wilson of New Mexico wrote the bill to help stop American Indian languages from disappearing. She says languages are an important part of American heritage and, once lost, will never be recovered.

The purpose of the law is to help keep Native American languages alive through language immersion programs. In immersion programs, the native language is used most of the time to teach different subjects and to communicate with students."

The Esther Martinez Native Languages Programs Reauthorization Act passed in the House of Representatives on December 9, 2019, and was signed into law on December 20, 2019.

== History ==
In December 2006, US H.R. 4766, the Esther Martinez Native American Languages Preservation Act, was signed into law by President George W. Bush, becoming Public Law No: 109-394. It authorized funding for new programs for tribes to prevent the loss of heritage and culture.

A CRS summary describes the types of instruction funded by the act:

Amends the Native American Programs Act of 1974 to authorize the Secretary of Health and Human Services, as part of the Native American languages grant program, to make three-year grants for educational Native American language nests, survival schools, and restoration programs.

Requires that Native American language nests: (1) provide instruction and child care through the use of a Native American language for at least 10 children under the age of seven for an average of at least 500 hours per year per student; (2) provide classes in such language for the parents of such students; and (3) use such language as the dominant medium of instruction in the nest.

Requires that Native American language survival schools: (1) provide an average of at least 500 hours of instruction per year per student through the use of at least one Native American language for at least 15 students for whom the school is their principal school; (2) develop instructional courses and materials that service the goal of making all students fluent in such a language and proficient in mathematics, reading, and science; (3) provide teacher training; and (4) be located in areas having high concentrations of Native American students. Requires applicants for language survival school funding to have at least three years of experience in running such a school, a Native American language nest, or any other educational program in which instruction is conducted in a Native American language.

Requires that Native American language restoration programs: (1) operate at least one Native American language program for the community they serve; (2) train teachers of such languages; and (3) develop Native American language instructional materials.

Authorizes appropriations for FY2008-FY2012.

== 2012 legislative update ==
As of Sept. 15, 2012, members of the New Mexico congressional delegation have introduced legislation to extend the program for another five years. "Senator Tom Udall of New Mexico is among the sponsors of S 3546; and New Mexico Representatives Martin Heinrich, Ben Ray Lujan, and Steve Pearce, are the sponsors of HR 6399." S 3546, a bill reauthorizing Native American Language programs, was reported out of the U.S. Senate Committee on Indian Affairs on September 20. An identical bill, HR 6399, was introduced in the House on September 13.

"Since 2000, 390 grants have been awarded under the program for a total of nearly $50 million to help preserve Native languages through language immersion programs."

According to Willard Gilbert, president of the National Indian Education Association (NIEA), "There were 175 Native American languages still spoken in 1996. However only twenty of these languages will still be spoken by the year 2050 without urgent help to keep them alive."

== See also ==
- Language nest
- Language immersion
- Language education in the United States
- Less Commonly Taught Languages
- Indigenous languages of the Americas
- Native American Languages Act of 1990
- Native Language Immersion Student Achievement Act
