= Critical languages series =

The University of Arizona Critical Languages Series (CLS) was a series of 14 language learning CD/DVD-ROMs published by the University of Arizona for the Less Commonly Taught Languages: Brazilian Portuguese, Cantonese, Chinese (Mandarin), Kazakh, Korean, Kurmanji Kurdish, Turkish, and Ukrainian.

Beginning level courses:

- Beginning Brazilian Portuguese
- Beginning Cantonese
- Beginning Chinese
- Beginning and Continuing Korean
- Beginning Kazakh
- Beginning Ukrainian
- Beginning Turkish
- Beginning Kurmanji Kurdish

Intermediate level courses:

- Intermediate Kazakh
- Intermediate Turkish
- Intermediate Cantonese
- Intermediate Ukrainian

Advanced level courses:

- Advanced Turkish
- Advanced Kazakh

== MaxAuthor ==
Each of the 14 courses was created with MaxAuthor, a free (for non-commercial use) authoring system created at the University of Arizona. For over a decade, it enabled language instructors to produce their own Computer assisted language instruction (CALI) materials for 47 languages including Chinese, Japanese, Korean, and many other Less Commonly Taught Languages.

Student activities included MaxBrowser, Listening Dictation, Pronunciation, Multiple Choice, Vocabulary Completion (Cloze), and Audio Flashcards. Lessons could be delivered to students via Internet or MS-Windows.

MaxAuthor is no longer under development.

== Critical reception ==
Many of the courses were reviewed in academic journals. The Critical Languages Series Online was a subscription-based service that delivered the same materials online.
