= Native Language Immersion Student Achievement Act =

United States law

The Native Language Immersion Student Achievement Act, S. 1948 was introduced on Jan 16, 2014. Its sponsor is Sen. Jon Tester [D-MT]. Cosponsors were Max Baucus [D-MT], Mark Begich [D-AK], Tim Johnson [D-SD], Brian Schatz [D-HI], Tom Udall [D-NM], and Lisa Murkowski [R-AK].

The bill "would amend the Elementary and Secondary Education Act of 1965 to provide increased federal financial support to Native American language programs at American Indian-focused schools." In 2015, the bill would provide $5 million in funding.

Support among Native Americans includes Oglala Sioux Tribal president Bryan Brewer and Rosebud Sioux Tribal president Cyril Scott. Congressional supporters include Senator John Walsh (D-MT).

== See also ==
- Esther Martinez Native American Languages Preservation Act
- Language nest
- Language immersion
- Language education in the United States
- Less Commonly Taught Languages
- Indigenous languages of the Americas
