= Prime Minister's Youth Council =

Advisory board created by the Prime Minister of Canada Justin Trudeau in 2016

- Conseil jeunesse du premier ministre

Agency overview
- Formed: 2016
- Jurisdiction: Government of Canada
- Headquarters: Ottawa, Ontario
- Ministers responsible: Mark Carney, Prime Minister; Marc Miller, Minister of Canadian Identity and Culture; Patty Hajdu, Minister of Jobs and Families; Anna Gainey, Secretary of State (Children and Youth)
- Agency executive: Mark Carney, Chair
- Parent department: Canadian Heritage; Privy Council Office
- Website: Official government website

The Prime Minister's Youth Council (French: Conseil jeunesse du premier ministre) is an advisory board created by the Prime Minister of Canada, Justin Trudeau, in 2016.

The council is a platform for youth in Canada aged 16 to 24 to provide non-partisan advice to the prime minister, cabinet ministers, and other officials on “key issues such as employment and education, building stronger communities as well as climate change and clean growth.” The stated purpose of the council is to provide opportunities for youth to influence policy by expressing themselves in their own voice, engaging directly with top government officials, to improve how the government understands and addresses the needs of Canada’s youth.

The council’s sixth cohort of 16 members concluded their terms in June 2025. The most recent application period for new members closed in April 2024. 70 young people have served as members on the council over the course of the initiative.

The council does not appear to have been active since the formation of the 30^{th} Canadian Ministry on March 14, 2025, under Prime Minister Mark Carney.

== Inception and launch ==
Creating a prime minister’s youth advisory council was a commitment put forward in the Liberal Party of Canada's platform during the 2015 Canadian federal election. Launching the council was further confirmed in Budget 2016, and Trudeau announced the call for applications to the council on Twitter on June 19, 2016, after which he fielded questions online. It was the first time he used social media to make a major announcement as Prime Minister.

The inaugural 15 members of the council were announced in September 2016, during Trudeau’s keynote speech at the One Young World Summit that was taking place in Ottawa at the same time as the Council’s first in-person meeting. According to a news release from the Prime Minister’s Office, over 14,000 people signed up to be considered for the council.

== Administration and budget ==
According to government records, the council is supported by the Youth Secretariat, which has a budget ranging between roughly $1.5 and $1.9 million per year, staffed by approximately eight personnel.

The Youth Secretariat "amplifies youth voices in Government decision-making... by supporting the activities of the Prime Minister's Youth Council, and monitoring and reporting on the diverse priorities and concerns of youth in Canada," including implementing Canada's Youth Policy and releasing a State of Youth Report every four years.

Council members are compensated for their participation in the council's work via a monthly $200 honorarium. The government also covers Council members' expenses involved with in-person meetings when they take place, including accommodation and travel costs.

== Timeline of activities and operations ==
=== 2015 to 2019, Justin Trudeau ===
From November 4, 2015 to July 18, 2018, Justin Trudeau held the cabinet portfolios of intergovernmental affairs and youth in addition to his chief position as Prime Minister of Canada. In this capacity he directly oversaw the council's operations, supported by the Youth Secretariat in the Privy Council Office.

From its launch up until the 2019 Canadian federal election, the council met in-person two to three times a year, with meetings that took place in locations across Canada, including Ottawa, Calgary, Montreal, St. John’s, Winnipeg, Toronto, Sherbrooke, and Iqaluit. Meetings included discussions with the Prime Minister, other ministers, parliamentary secretaries, other parliamentarians and senior government officials on various topics, and occurred over two to three days. Between in-person meetings, the council would meet via teleconference.

Peter Schiefke, Parliamentary Secretary to the Prime Minister (Youth), also attended in-person meetings, worked with council members and supported the prime minister in leading the council.

As part of in-person meetings, council members met and engaged with local youth groups, including youth of Kahnawake, the Premier’s Youth Council of Newfoundland and Labrador, students of Red River College, Fédération de la jeunesse canadienne-française, Sacred 7 Youth Council, and the Dialogue+ Project (Actions interculturelles). Meetings often included site visits to youth-serving organizations, such as Covenant House Toronto, and landmarks such as the Canadian Museum of Human Rights.

Council meetings occasionally took place around the same date and city as cabinet retreats, including in Calgary and St John’s in 2017, and Sherbrooke in 2019. This provided opportunities for individual ministers to attend segments of meetings and hear from council members on their portfolio.

=== 2019 to 2021, Vice-Chair Bardish Chagger ===
Following the 2019 Canadian federal election, Bardish Chagger was named as the Minister of Diversity and Inclusion and Youth, and directed to serve the council as Vice-Chair, with Trudeau continuing to act as Chair of the council.

The council’s operations shifted to a predominantly virtual setting due to the COVID-19 pandemic, with roughy 17 virtual meetings during Minister Chagger’s 21-month tenure in this role. The Youth Secretariat was transferred from the Privy Council Office to the Department of Canadian Heritage, and work focused on collaborating with other youth to develop and deliver Canada's State of Youth Report, which was published in August 2021.

The council's activities became diminished from public prominence during this period, relative to the initial 2015-2019 period which saw regular in-person meetings across Canada. This was in part due to more virtual collaboration required by various pandemic-related restrictions, but also likely affected by the Trudeau government becoming embroiled in the WE Charity scandal, which implicated the government's record and credibility on its youth and student-related portfolios.

=== 2021 to 2025, Vice-Chair Marci Ien ===
After the 2021 Canadian federal election when a new cabinet was created, Marci Ien was sworn in as Minister of Women and Gender Equality and Youth. The council continued to work mostly virtually, with individual council members posting meeting recaps on the Government of Canada's youth-focused Instagram page to stay engaged with the public. The council returned to holding in-person meetings once per year in Ottawa in August 2022, August 2023, and May 2024.

On March 5, 2025, Minister Ien held a meeting with council members to recognize their accomplishments as they approached the end of their mandate. No new council members nor other activities have been announced or shared since the formal conclusion of these members' mandates in June 2025.

== Challenges, criticisms, and controversies ==
=== Independence, tokenism, and perceptions of partisanship ===
The Council has received criticism and commentary on its relative independence and non-partisanship, as well as the government's control over how the council's activities and advice from members are communicated publicly. Early in the council's operations, Maclean's magazine published an article suggesting that the initiative engages in tokenism intended to fit the ruling government's overall political image, rather than meaningfully bringing youth voices to the table.

Other critics have argued that small appointed youth councils serve to undermine how access to political institutions and decision-making is made available to other youth groups, such as student unions, which have more direct (and wider) democratic representativeness, but may be less agreeable to a given government's agenda.

These commentaries show a social and political tension discussed previously in academic literature, regarding the proliferation of government-run youth advisory councils and the broader implications of political leaders creating such bodies as a means to select specific youth voices to listen to, while allowing them to avoid engaging with youth grassroots movements, youth-led organizations, and other forms of youth activism that may be less politically desirable to consult or collaborate with.

=== Inclusion of youth from remote and northern communities ===
There were early criticisms that the online application process as well as virtual meetings posed a barrier to participation for youth in rural and remote parts of Canada, including Inuit youth, as Internet access is not widespread in Nunavut, Nunatsiavut, Nunavik and other Arctic areas of Canada. Trudeau stated that he will work with organisations to ensure all youth are connected during the initiative.

Of the 70 young people who have been members of the Council to date, around 11 have been from communities in the Yukon, the Northwest Territories, and Nunavut. Additional members have come from other more rural and remote parts of Canada.

In 2019, the Council held a three-day in-person meeting in Iqaluit, Nunavut, which focused on issues affecting youth in Inuit and northern communities.

=== 2018 opposition to Trans Mountain pipeline purchase ===
Following the Government of Canada's announcement in May 2018 that it would purchase the Trans Mountain pipeline from Kinder Morgan in order to secure the completion of its expansion project, a majority of current and former members of the council released an open letter expressing "immense disappointment" in the decision. The letter urged the Prime Minister to cancel the buyout, to pledge not to escalate violence or use militarized police forces to confront protesters demonstrating against the project, and to hold a special open session with young Canadians to discuss the matter.

The letter added to the existing controversy surrounding the issue, which had already been met with a "storm of criticism" from environmental groups, Indigenous leaders and opposition politicians. It became a flashpoint of criticism against the Trudeau government, seen as breaking its promises to protect the coast of British Columbia, to uphold international climate commitments, and to renew Canada's relationship with Indigenous peoples.

For the council, it marked a moment where for the first time its members gave a public recommendation to the Prime Minister, which drew some attention as a result. Coverage focused on the public nature of the letter's delivery, how not at all members agreed to the letter or its release, and whether the letter potentially constituted a political or partisan action by a non-partisan advisory body.

One council member later published a reflection on the controversy, framing it as a stark example of ageism deployed to dismiss the legitimate concerns of young people, to the detriment of society at large. She stated, "Ageism marginalizes our voices and limits our access to opportunity; from a youth perspective, the inherent belief that all young people lack experience, maturity, or competency to express valid opinions or complete tasks means that doors are locked before we can even try to open them."

=== 2018 resignation of council member ===
On December 5, 2018, a member resigned from the council approximately one month before the end of her term. Her resignation was in response to Justin Trudeau's comments at a G20 meeting in Argentina on gender equality. His comment, "Well, there are gender impacts when you bring construction workers into a rural area, there are social impacts because there are mostly male construction workers, how are you adjusting and adapting to those?" had received some public backlash as negatively depicting male construction workers.

In her resignation letter and Facebook post, the council member expressed how the comments were ignorant and hurtful to rural Albertans working in the oil and gas industry, for which she is a construction worker and community member herself.

=== 2019 Justin Trudeau brownface/blackface controversy and anti-racism efforts ===
A council member disclosed in an article that Justin Trudeau had called him in September 2019 to express remorse in the wake of the blackface incident during the 2019 Canadian federal election campaign, when Time magazine published a photograph of Trudeau wearing brownface makeup in the spring of 2001.

The July 2020 article discussed how this incident, including Trudeau's personal call with the council member and the broader momentum of the Black Lives Matter movement (especially following the murder of George Floyd), moved the council to send a letter to Trudeau "calling on the prime minister and his cabinet to endorse and implement our anti-racism calls to action."

Although the letter led to a meeting with Trudeau to discuss the council's recommendations, and the council member acknowledged some positive developments, he expressed overall disappointment and disillusionment at inadequate action by the federal government to address systemic racism.
