= Title 25 of the United States Code =

U.S. federal statutes on Native Americans

Title 25 of the United States Code outlines the role of Indians in the United States Code.

- 25 U.S.C. ch. 1 – Bureau of Indian Affairs
- 25 U.S.C. ch. 2 – Officers of Indian Affairs
- 25 U.S.C. ch. 2A – Indian Claims Commission
- 25 U.S.C. ch. 3 – Agreements With Indians
- 25 U.S.C. ch. 4 – Performance by United States of Obligations to Indians
- 25 U.S.C. ch. 5 – Protection of Indians
- 25 U.S.C. ch. 6 – Government of Indian Country and Reservations
- 25 U.S.C. ch. 7 – Education of Indians
- 25 U.S.C. ch. 7A – Promotion of Social and Economic Welfare
- 25 U.S.C. ch. 8 – Rights-Of-Way Through Indian Lands
- 25 U.S.C. ch. 9 – Allotment of Indian Lands
- 25 U.S.C. ch. 10 – Descent and Distribution; Heirs of Allottee
- 25 U.S.C. ch. 11 – Irrigation of Allotted Lands
- 25 U.S.C. ch. 12 – Lease, Sale, or Surrender of Allotted or Unallotted Lands
- 25 U.S.C. ch. 13 – Ceded Indian Lands
- 25 U.S.C. ch. 14 – Miscellaneous
- 25 U.S.C. ch. 15 – Constitutional Rights of Indians
- 25 U.S.C. ch. 16 – Distribution of Judgment Funds
- 25 U.S.C. ch. 17 – Financing Economic Development of Indians and Indian Organizations
- 25 U.S.C. ch. 18 – Indian Health Care
- 25 U.S.C. ch. 19 – Indian Land Claims Settlements
- 25 U.S.C. ch. 20 – Tribally Controlled College or University Assistance
- 25 U.S.C. ch. 21 – Indian Child Welfare
- 25 U.S.C. ch. 22 – Bureau of Indian Affairs Programs
- 25 U.S.C. ch. 23 – Development of Tribal Mineral Resources
- 25 U.S.C. ch. 24 – Indian Land Consolidation
- 25 U.S.C. ch. 25 – Old Age Assistance Claims Settlement
- 25 U.S.C. ch. 26 – Indian Alcohol and Substance Abuse Prevention and Treatment
- 25 U.S.C. ch. 27 – Tribally Controlled School Grants
- 25 U.S.C. ch. 28 – Indian Education Program
- 25 U.S.C. ch. 29 – Indian Gaming Regulation
- 25 U.S.C. ch. 30 – Indian Law Enforcement Reform
- 25 U.S.C. ch. 31 – Native American Languages
- 25 U.S.C. ch. 32 – Native American Graves Protection and Repatriation
- 25 U.S.C. ch. 33 – National Indian Forest Resources Management
- 25 U.S.C. ch. 34 – Indian Child Protection and Family Violence Prevention
- 25 U.S.C. ch. 35 – Indian Higher Education Programs
- 25 U.S.C. ch. 36 – Indian Employment, Training and Related Services
- 25 U.S.C. ch. 37 – Indian Energy Resources
- 25 U.S.C. ch. 38 – Indian Tribal Justice Support
- 25 U.S.C. ch. 38A – Indian Tribal Justice Technical and Legal Assistance
- 25 U.S.C. ch. 39 – American Indian Agricultural Resource Management
- 25 U.S.C. ch. 40 – Indian Dams Safety
- 25 U.S.C. ch. 41 – Indian Lands Open Dump Cleanup
- 25 U.S.C. ch. 42 – American Indian Trust Fund Management Reform
- 25 U.S.C. ch. 43 – Native American Housing Assistance and Self-Determination
- 25 U.S.C. ch. 44 – Native American Business Development, Trade Promotion, and Tourism
