= Esther Martinez =

Tewa activist and linguist (1912–2006)

- Pʼoe Tsą́wą̈́
- Born: 1912; Ignacio, Colorado, U.S.
- Died: September 16, 2006 (aged 94); Española, New Mexico, U.S.
- Other names: Estefanita Martinez, "Ko'oe Esther"
- Education: Santa Fe Indian School, Albuquerque Indian School
- Occupations: Linguist, teacher in Ohkay Owingeh, New Mexico
- Known for: Dedication to preserving the Tewa language
- Children: 10
- Relatives: Grandson, Dr. Matthew J. Martinez Sister, Bertha Burck
- Awards: National Heritage Fellowship (2006), others

Esther Martinez, also known as Estefanita Martinez (1912 – September 16, 2006), was an American linguist and storyteller for the Tewa people of New Mexico. Martinez was given the Tewa name Pʼoe Tsą́wą̈́ (meaning Blue Water) and was also known by various affectionate names, including "Ko'oe Esther" and "Aunt Esther".

She lived to be 94 years old, and was known for her commitment to preserving the Tewa language. Her San Juan Pueblo Téwa Dictionary was published in 1982.

== Biography ==
Martinez grew up in the Southwest. She was born in Ignacio, Colorado, where she lived with her parents; later, she lived with her grandparents in Ohkay Owingeh. Later in life, she would write:

You who have grandparents to talk to are so lucky, because I treasure my grandparents and the things that I have learned from them. My grandfather was a storyteller. Indian people get their lessons from stories they were told as children. So a lot of our stories are learning experiences.

Martinez attended the Santa Fe Indian School and the Albuquerque Indian School, graduating from the latter in 1930.

"That she survived her years in boarding school and went on to help her community by perpetuating the language is a powerful statement," said her grandson, Matthew J. Martinez. "No matter the harsh conditions, she still carried that desire to hold on to her language and culture and document it and pass it on," said Martinez, who learned Tewa from her."

As an adult, Esther Martinez would become one of the greatest champions in the fight to preserve the Tewa language. New Mexico's first lady, Barbara Richardson, said "She went on to almost single-handedly save the Tewa language."

After graduation, she raised ten children and worked various cooking and cleaning jobs. In the mid-60s, while she was working at John F. Kennedy Middle School in Pueblo, she met a linguist, Randall Speirs, who asked for her help in documenting the Tewa language. She worked with him during the 1960s and 1970s to develop a Tewa language dictionary. Tewa is spoken amongst 6 pueblos in New Mexico: the Santa Clara Pueblo, San Ildefonso Pueblo, San Juan Pueblo, Nambe Pueblo, Pojoaque Pueblo, and the Tesuque Pueblo. The Hopi-Tewa are an additional Tewa speaking group, located in Arizona.

From about 1974 to 1989, Martinez taught Tewa at Ohkay Owingeh. She translated the New Testament into Tewa, in association with Wycliffe Bible Translators. She also wrote a collection of stories, My Life In San Juan Pueblo: Stories of Esther Martinez, published by University of Illinois Press in 2004, which received the Elli Köngäs-Maranda Prize.

Martinez received an honorary Bachelor of Arts in Early Childhood Education from Northern New Mexico College in 2006, where she worked with the Northern Pueblo Institute. She served as a traditional storyteller for the National Park Service.

On September 16, 2006, Martinez was returning home from Washington, D.C., where she had been awarded a National Heritage Fellowship by the National Endowment for the Arts, at a banquet in the Great Hall of the Library of Congress. Near Española, New Mexico, the car in which she was riding was hit by another vehicle, whose driver had been drinking. Martinez was killed in the crash, which occurred only a few miles from her home.

== Legacy ==
In December 2006, US H.R. 4766, the Esther Martinez Native American Languages Preservation Act, was signed into law, authorizing funding for new programs that tribes will use to prevent the loss of heritage and culture. As of September 15, 2012, members of the New Mexico congressional delegation have introduced legislation to extend the program for another five years. In December 2019, Congress passed US S.256, the Esther Martinez Native American Languages Programs Reauthorization Act, which further extended the original 2006 act until 2024.

The San Juan Pueblo Téwa Dictionary, written by Martinez in 1992, was described as "one of the most remarkable of these efforts at documentation of an endangered language, "... [by] Melissa Axelrod, associate professor of linguistics at the University of New Mexico. "It has a wealth of vocabulary and grammatical information and is rich with cultural nuance."

As of 2008, her grandson, Dr. Matthew J. Martinez "serves on the Ohkay Owingeh School Board, where he is assisting in the implementation and support of the Tewa language curriculum."

== Publications ==
- My Life In San Juan Pueblo: Stories of Esther Martinez. University of Illinois Press, 2004 ISBN 0252028899
- Naughty Little Rabbit and Old Man Coyote: A Tewa Story from San Juan Pueblo, (as Estefanita Martinez) Illustrated by Rick Regan, Children's Press, Chicago, 1992 ISBN 0516051415
- San Juan Pueblo Téwa Dictionary. San Juan Pueblo Bilingual Program, San Juan Pueblo, New Mexico, 1982; Bishop Publishing, 1983.

== Awards and honors ==
- On November 8, 2008, a New Mexico State Historic Marker was unveiled on Ohkay Owingeh and dedicated to Esther Martinez.
- She was a recipient of a 2006 National Heritage Fellowship awarded by the National Endowment for the Arts, which is the United States government's highest honor in the folk and traditional arts.
- Honorary Bachelor of Arts, Northern New Mexico College (2006)
- Indigenous Language Institute Award for "Those Who Make a Difference" (1999)
- New Mexico Arts Commission Governor's Award for Excellence and Achievement in the Arts (1998)
- Indian Education Award for Teacher of the Year from the National Council of American Indians
- National Council of American Indians, Woman of the Year Award (1997)
- Living Treasure Award from the State of New Mexico (1996)
- National Association for Bilingual Education, Pioneer Award (1992)

== Gallery ==
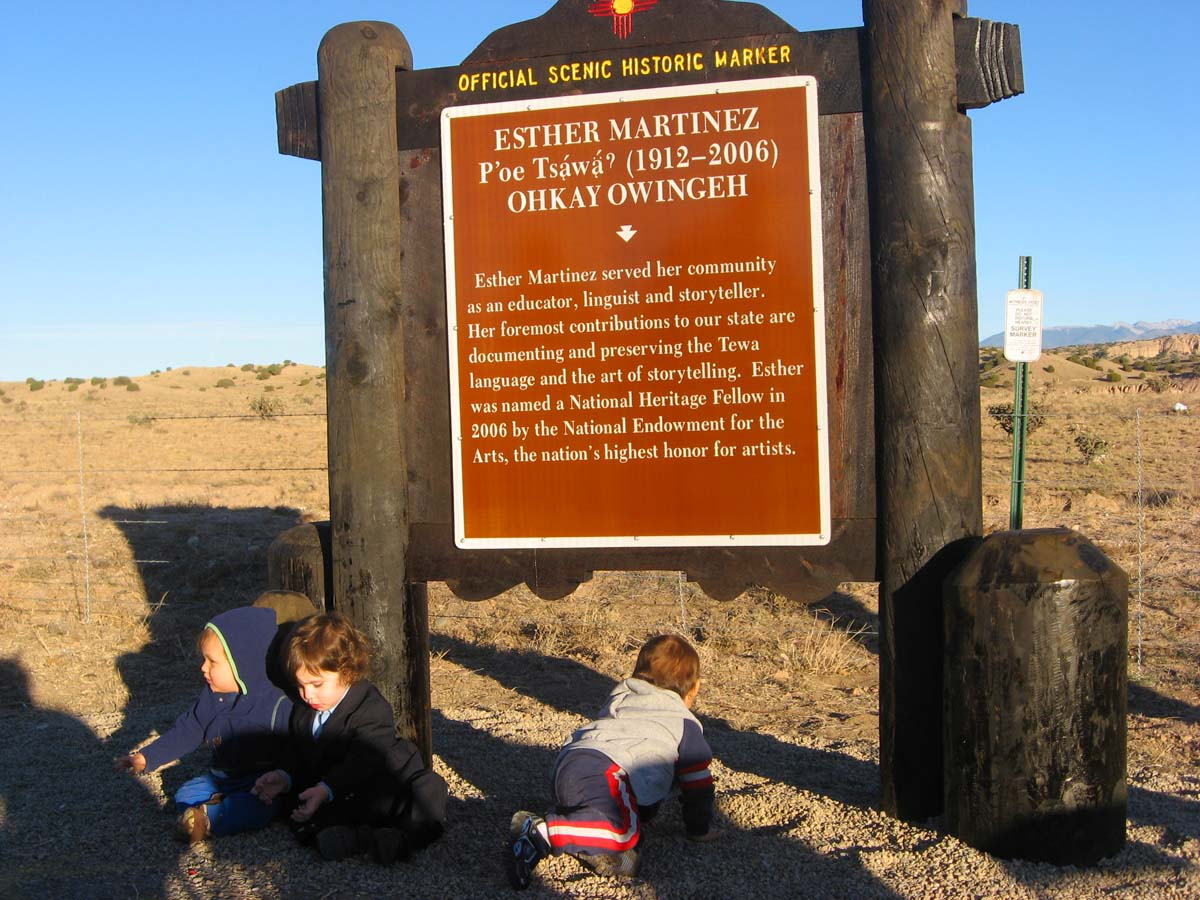
New Mexico Historic Marker for Esther Martinez

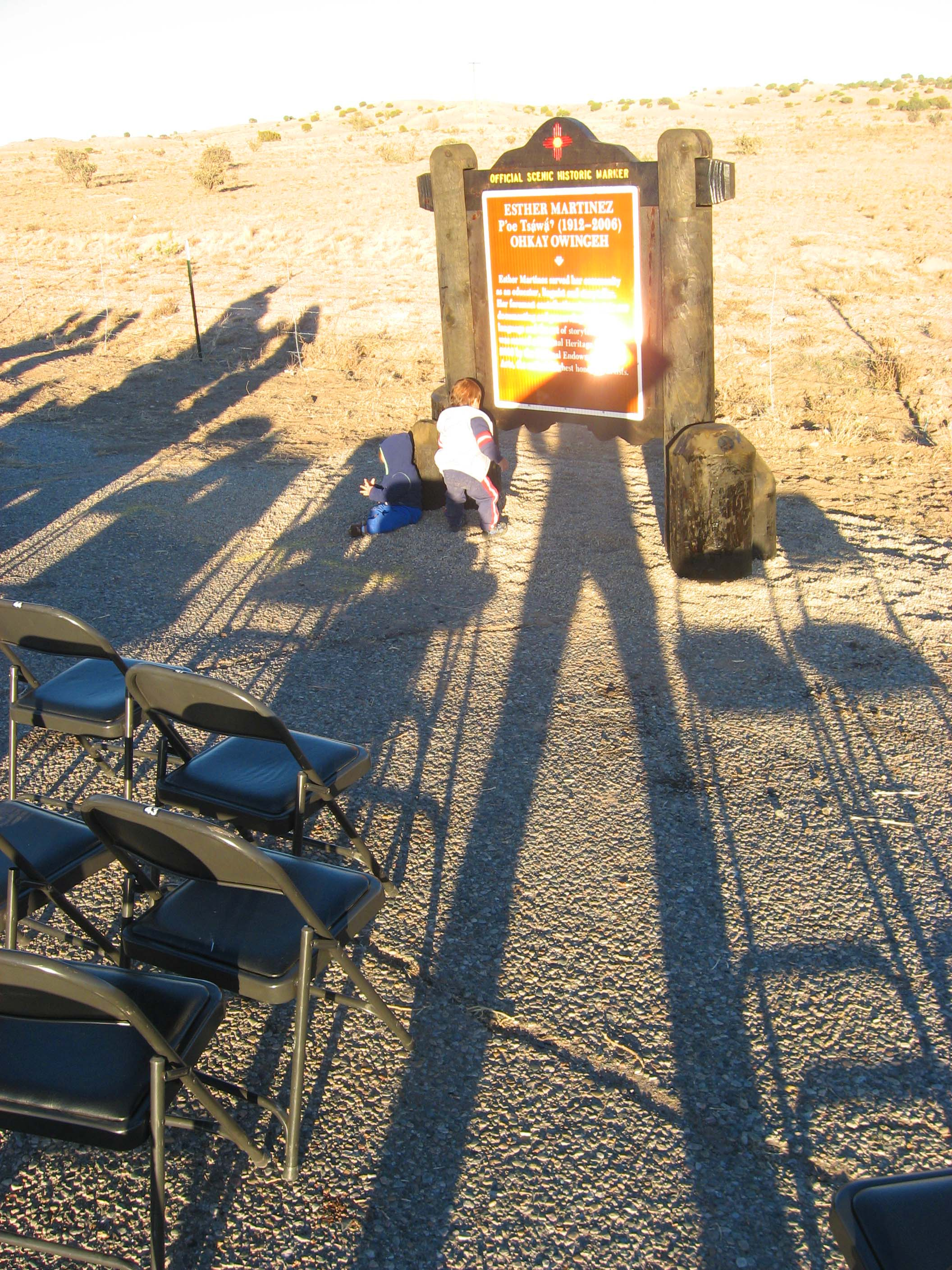
Dedication of Historic Marker, November 8, 2008

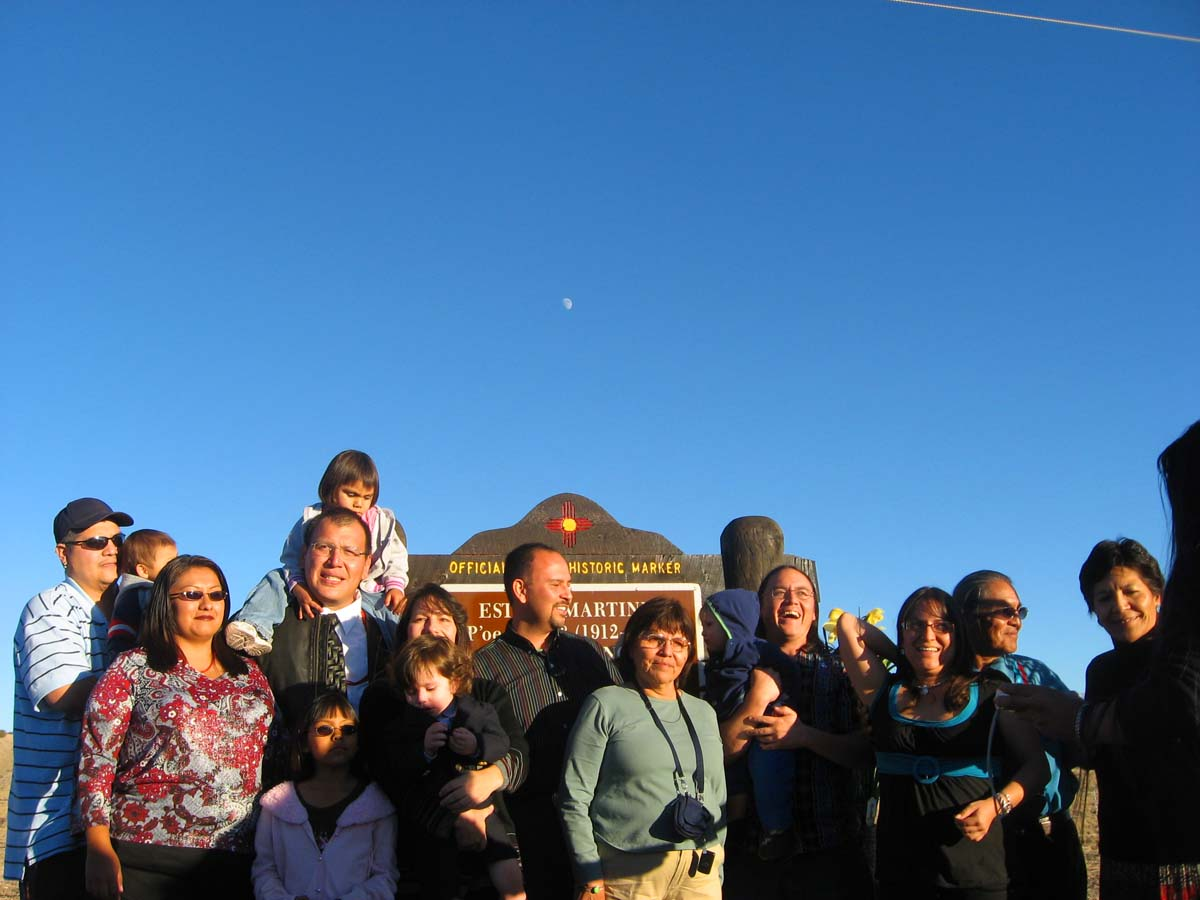
A small part of Esther Martinez's family
