= Explore (education) =

Explore, Destination Clic, and Odyssey are three educational exchange programs administered by the Council of Ministers of Education, Canada (CMEC) and funded by the Department of Canadian Heritage to promote bilingualism in Canada.

CMEC is a coordinating body for the various provincial education ministries. It operates these educational exchange programs with funding assistance from the federal Department of Canadian Heritage.

== Bursary programs ==
The Summer Language Bursary Program (later Explore) was created in 1971 by the Government of Canada and funded by the Secretary of State on the advice of the first Official Languages Commissioner, Keith Spicer. This was joined by Official Language Monitor Program (now Odyssy) in 1973 and the Programme de bourses d’été pour francophones hors Québec (PBEFHQ; meaning "Summer bursary program for French-speakers outside of Quebec"; now Destination Clic) in 1977. By 1983, the Summer Language Bursary Program had a budget of $13 million per year, which the then-languages commission Max Yalden thought was a better investment than the "bilingual bonus" being paid to federal civil servants; at the time the SLBP was turning away two out of every three applicants.

Explore provides bursaries for students to travel for 5 weeks to another province and immerse themselves in one of Canada's two official languages (English and French). Summer programs for language learning predate the bursaries but are now considered the main source for most students who attend them. Explore is offered during the spring or summer for people with any skill level in their second language. Explore participants are awarded a bursary that covers tuition fees for the course, instructional materials, meals, and accommodation. They will discover another region of Canada while learning French (or English) in classes adapted to their language level. Through classroom instructions, workshops, sociocultural activities, and field trips, they will not only improve their language skills, but discover the culture of a new region as well, all while exploring, meeting new people from across the country, and exchanging ideas in a stimulating environment perfect for learning their second language.

Destination Clic provides bursaries for francophone youth (grades 8 and 9) to practice their French in another region of Canada.

Odyssey provides a salary for Canadians to work as a language assistant working in a school. Members of the program teach their first (or stronger) language to learners from another language group. Under the supervision of a teacher, they will use games and other activities on a daily basis to motivate students to learn more about their second language. Language assistants will have the opportunity to share their culture, drawing from personal experiences.

== Receiving organizations ==
=== The Association québécoise des écoles de français langue étrangère ===
The Association québécoise des écoles de français langue étrangère ("Quebec Association of French as a Foreign Language Schools", or AQEFLE, founded in 1980) is the grouping for many the institutions that receive funding from Explore. Member schools As of 2017 are the Centre linguistique at the Collège de Jonquière, the Ateliers de langues at Collège Saint-Charles-Garnier, the French school at the Collège de Rivière-du-Loup, the École de langues at Université Laval, the École de français at the Université du Québec à Trois-Rivières, the École de français de Trois-Pistoles (part of the University of Western Ontario), the École de français at Collège de Sainte-Anne-de-la-Pocatière, and the French language school at Université de Montréal.

The oldest among these is the school at Trois Pistoles which was founded in 1932, and As of 2017 hosts over 600 learners per summer (two five-week cohorts of 250 students plus other short-stay learners) into the small town of just 3,500 residents. It is considered a major economic driver in the town and federal cuts in 2010 were perceived as a threat.

== In popular culture ==
The 2011 film French Immersion is a parody of the kind of intensive French immersion course for adults funded by Explore.

== See also ==
- Katimavik
