= The Korea Herald =

South Korean English-language newspaper

- Type: Daily newspaper
- Format: Broadsheet
- Owner: Herald Media Inc.
- Publisher: Jeon Chang-hyeop
- Editor: Lee Joo-hee
- Staff writers: 50
- Founded: August 1953; 72 years ago
- Language: English
- Headquarters: Huam-ro 4-gil 10 Herald Square, Yongsan-gu, Seoul, Republic of Korea
- Country: South Korea
- Website: www.koreaherald.com

The Korea Herald (Korean: 코리아헤럴드) is a South Korean English-language daily newspaper founded in August 1953 and published in Seoul. The editorial staff is composed of Korean and international writers and editors, with additional news coverage drawn from international news agencies such as the Associated Press.

The Korea Herald is operated by Herald Corporation. Herald Corporation also publishes The Herald Business, a Korean-language business daily, The Junior Herald, an English weekly for teens, The Campus Herald, a Korean-language weekly for university students. Herald Media is also active in the country's booming English as a foreign language sector, operating a chain of hagwon as well as an English village.

The Korea Herald is a member of the Asia News Network.

== History ==
=== The Korean Republic ===
The Korea Herald was first published on August 13, 1953, as The Korean Republic. It was a four-page, tabloid-sized, English-language daily. In 1958, The Korean Republic published its fifth anniversary issue of 84 pages, the largest ever in Korea. On July 11, 1961, it increased its page sizes. In February 1962, The Korean Republic published its first daily educational supplement and launched the Korean Republic English Institute (the Korea Herald Language Institute). From February 1964, its weekly overseas edition had 12 tabloid-sized pages.

=== The Korea Herald ===
In August 1965, The Korean Republic was renamed The Korea Herald. In March 1970, it began publishing a tabloid-sized monthly magazine called Korean Frontier that it distributed to universities and libraries internationally. The magazine focused on promoting Korean culture. This magazine was converted to a weekly publication called Korean News Review in September 1972, and published on current affairs. During the 1970s, the paper established branch offices abroad. It had offices in New York City, Tokyo, Hong Kong, and Sydney. In March 1975, the newspaper introduced Korea's first computerized typesetting system. In April 1982, the daily international edition of The Korea Herald was launched as an eight-page tabloid.

=== Internet ===
In January 1997, the company published the official newspaper of the 18th Winter Universiad. In 1997, Korea Telecom selected The Korea Herald as the official public database partner. The first Herald School, a franchised English education center for children, opened in 2000 as the Herald Academy Inc. In August of the same year, The Korea Herald began to publish 20 pages daily. According to The Guardian in 2002, The Korea Herald had a specialty in IT and business news.

=== The Junior Herald ===
In 2004, Herald Media won the right to manage the Seoul English Village, an English language immersion school set up by the Seoul Metropolitan City government; the Pungnap Campus opened in December 2004 and similar ones opened in the following years. In May 2004, The Junior Herald, an English-language newspaper for preteens, was launched.

== See also ==
- List of newspapers
- Media in South Korea
