= English village =

Places to learn the English language

English villages are language education institutions which aim to create a language immersion environment for students of English in their own country.

The concept is run as a commercial venture in Spain, Italy, Poland, and Hungary and is quasi-governmental in South Korea (see below).

== Spain ==
The first English Village experience was in July 2001 in Valdelavilla, Soria, Spain.

Valdelavilla has been recreated in cyberspace in the Second Life game, populated by English and Spanish avatars who all have English as a common language.

== Italy ==
The first Italian English Village was in Umbria in 2005. The current village is in the Umbria region, in the Tevere valley.

== Poland ==
The first Polish English Village program was launched in 2010 by Angloville and has since spread to a four locations in the East and South West of Poland. Both adult and junior programmes are organized.

The second English immersion programme in Poland, AngloBridge, opened in 2016, and courses primarily organised in the South and Centre of the country.

== Hungary ==
Angloville Hungary was launched in 2014 with programmes branded "language island" organized near Budapest and lake Balaton, plus a summer junior programme near Győr.

== Romania ==
Angloville Romania opened in 2015. Week-long language immersion programmes are held in the mountain resort of Bușteni in the Prahova valley, north of Bucharest.

== Turkey ==
EEC-Anglo has been offering English Village projects since 2006. Intensive residential English programmes are organised in an isolated mountain-top venue near Istanbul

== South Korea ==
- English village
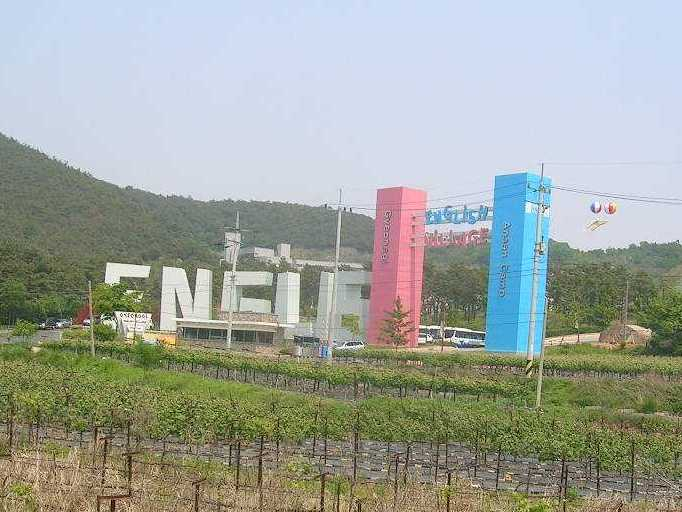
- Entrance to Ansan English village.

Korean name
- Hangul: 영어마을
- Hanja: 英語마을
- RR: Yeongeo maeul
- MR: Yŏngŏ maŭl

English villages in South Korea provide a short-term immersion English experience in a live-in environment where only English is spoken. This is intended to promote English learning and to build students' Anglo-American cultural awareness. The first English village was opened in August 2004 in Ansan, Gyeonggi Province. Additional English villages have been opened in both Gyeonggi Province and Seoul. As of September 2012, there are 32 of such mini towns in suburban areas.

English villages employ a mixture of foreign native speakers of English and fluent English-speaking Korean staff. They are intended to help students face the particular challenges of speaking English in the Korean context. Many families seek to improve their children's English ability by sending them to expensive after-school programs and by sending them to study abroad in English-speaking countries. Study abroad results in a substantial amount of money leaving the country. The English villages are intended to reduce this loss, and make the immersion experience accessible to students from low-income families as well. However, many questions remain whether the English villages will be cost-effective. In fact, most have been privatized due to operating losses.

The English village concept is to be expanded in the near future as financially it has not been a complete failure. The government will begin to use money for projects like this in the future in addition to sending students on scholarships overseas, despite spending money on short term construction projects.

=== Gyeonggi-do ===
The English villages of Gyeonggi province are overseen by the Gyeonggi English Culture Foundation, a quasi-governmental body established on the initiative of provincial governor Son Hak-Gyu. The original Ansan Camp was spun off in 2007, and is currently leased to a Christian organization.

The much larger Paju Camp opened in 2006. In addition to the week-long residential programs, the facility also hosts many day visitors. Day visitors may be individuals, families, or large groups. English Village Paju Camp offers many special programs including a month-long vacation program, Family Programs, Military Programs, teacher training, and the Civil Servants Program.

In addition to the current villages, the foundation established another in Yangpyeong County in 2008. Thereafter, the foundation hopes to franchise the English village concept to other cities.

=== Current Developments ===
One Month Program (Vacation Intensive Program)

Two week programs were combined to form the One Month Program, the first of its kind in Korea. It is presented twice a year as a summer camp during July and winter camp during January. It was highly successful with students returning. This was a result of highly motivated teachers.

Long Term Program (LTP)

The Long Term Program is a 10-week intensive adult program that offers a great opportunity to practice and enhance their English skills in and outside of class by speaking with foreign teachers around English Village. The students live there so they are encouraged to participate in the many extracurricular activities with the foreigners that are in and outside of English Village.

=== Ansan ===
Ansan English Village was established in 2004 on Daebu Island on the coast of the Yellow Sea. Built on the site of a former government complex, the campus covers an area of 184,800 m^{2}, including athletic facilities. It has approximately 50 full-time staff. It employs a content-based curriculum, with English-medium courses on topics including world music and dance, global awareness, cooking, and broadcasting.

The village provides weekend and weekday programs, with a month-long program planned for school vacations. The weekend program works with families, training parents in how to encourage their children to speak English. The weekday program takes in about 200 middle school students per week, drawn each week from a different school in Gyeonggi province. The village is currently run by the Seventh-day Adventist Church, although religion is not taught.

=== Seoul ===
Seoul English Village was contracted by the Seoul government to a consortium of companies including Herald Media publisher of The Korea Herald English newspaper. Herald Media manages the daily operations, curriculum development, and implementation of programs at SEV. It opened in late November 2004. The campus, located in Songpa District in southeastern Seoul, has an area of 16,500 m^{2}.

=== Other Areas ===
English Villages have opened in other provinces, including: South Jeolla Province, South Gyeongsang Province and in various cities in Taiwan. Another English Village is set to open in Jeju Province. There is also the English village in the Busan, it is called the Busan Global Villager.

== See also ==
- Education in South Korea
- English language learning and teaching
- English language learning in Canada
