= List of most commonly learned second languages in the United States =

The tables below provide a list of second languages most frequently taught in American schools and colleges. They reflect the popularity of these languages in terms of the total number of enrolled students in the United States.

== Lists ==
=== K-12 ===
Below are the top second languages studied in public K-12 schools (i.e., primary and secondary schools). The tables correspond to the 18.5% (some 8.9 million) of all K-12 students in the U.S. (about 49 million) who take foreign-language classes.

K-12 students (2007-2008)
Rank	Language	Enrollments	Percentage
1	Spanish	6,418,331	72.06%
2	French	1,254,243	14.08%
3	German	395,019	4.43%
4	Latin	205,158	2.30%
5	Japanese	72,845	0.82%
6	Chinese	59,860	0.67%
7	Russian	12,389	0.14%
	Others	489,356	5.49%
	Total	8,907,201	100%

=== Colleges and universities ===
Below are the top foreign languages studied in American institutions of higher education (i.e., colleges and universities), based on the Modern Language Association's census of fall 2021 enrollments. "Percentage" refers to each language as a percentage of total U.S. foreign language enrollments.

College and university students (2021)
Rank	Language	Enrollments	Percentage
1	Spanish	584,453	49.4%
2	French	135,088	11.4%
3	American Sign Language	107,899	9.1%
4	Japanese	65,661	5.6%
5	German	53,543	4.5%
6	Chinese	46,492	3.9%
7	Italian	45,182	3.8%
8	Arabic	22,918	1.9%
9	Latin	19,472	1.6%
10	Korean	19,270	1.6%
11	Russian	17,598	1.5%
12	Greek, Ancient	11,433	1.0%
13	Hebrew, Biblical	10,442	0.9%
14	Portuguese	7,684	0.6%
15	Hebrew, Modern	4,125	0.3%
	Less Commonly Taught Languages	31,302	2.6%
	Total	1,182,562	

== List of top five most commonly learned languages by year ==
=== Grades K-12 ===
Year	Languages									
Year	1	%	2	%	3	%	4	%	5	%
2004–2005	Spanish	72.9	French	15.0	German	4.2	Latin	2.6	Japanese	0.7
2007–2008	Spanish	72.1	French	14.1	German	4.4	Latin	2.3	Japanese	0.8

=== Higher education ===
Year	Languages				
Year	1	2	3	4	5
1960	French	Spanish	German	Russian	Italian
1968	French	Spanish	German	Russian	Latin
1980	Spanish	French	German	Italian	Latin
1990	Spanish	French	German	Italian	Japanese
1995	Spanish	French	German	Japanese	Italian
1998	Spanish	French	German	Italian	Japanese
2002	Spanish	French	German	Italian	American Sign
2006	Spanish	French	German	American Sign	Italian
2009	Spanish	French	German	American Sign	Italian
2013	Spanish	French	American Sign	German	Italian
2016	Spanish	French	American Sign	German	Japanese
2021	Spanish	French	American Sign	Japanese	German

== See also ==
- Language education in the United States
- Less Commonly Taught Languages
- French language in the United States
- German language in the United States
- Italian language in the United States
- Spanish language in the United States
- World language
