= Language Resource Center =

The Language Resource Center (LRC) Program of the U.S. Department of Education, administered by the International Foreign Language Education Service under Title VI of the Higher Education Act, funds grants to American universities for establishing, strengthening, and operating centers that serve as resources for improving the nation's capacity for teaching and learning foreign languages through teacher training, research, materials development, and dissemination projects.

The common goal of the Language Resource Centers (LRCs) is to promote the learning and teaching of foreign languages in the United States through improving language teacher education, developing improved assessment measures, and conducting research. The US Department of Education established the first LRCs at US universities in 1990 in response to the growing national need for expertise and competence in foreign languages. Led by nationally and internationally recognized language professionals, LRCs create language learning materials, offer professional development workshops, and conduct research on foreign language learning.

The Language Resource Centers created a common LRC Web Portal, which provides a searchable database to all of LRC the materials, resources, and professional development opportunities.

== 2002-2005 grant cycle (12 LRCs were funded) ==
1. Center for Advanced Language Proficiency Education and Research (Penn State)
2. Center for Applied Second Language Studies (UO)
3. Center for Languages of the Central Asian Region (IU)
4. Center for Language Education and Research (MSU)
5. Language Acquisition Resource Center (SDSU)
6. National African Language Resource Center (UW-Madison)
7. National Capital Language Resource Center (Georgetown, GWU, CAL)
8. National East Asian Language Resource Center (OSU)
9. National Foreign Language Resource Center (UH)
10. National Middle East Language Resource Center (BYU)
11. South Asia Language Resource Center (UC)
12. Slavic and East European Language Research Center (Duke)

== 2006-2009 grant cycle (15 LRCs were funded) ==
1. Center for Advanced Language Proficiency Education and Research (Penn State)
2. Center for Advanced Research on Language Acquisition (U of M)
3. Center for Applied Second Language Studies (UO)
4. Center for Educational Resources in Culture, Language and Literacy (UA
5. Center for Languages of the Central Asian Region (IU)
6. Center for Language Education and Research (MSU)
7. Language Acquisition Resource Center (SDSU)
8. National African Language Resource Center (UW-Madison)
9. National Capital Language Resource Center (Georgetown, GWU, CAL)
10. National East Asian Language Resource Center (OSU)
11. National Foreign Language Resource Center (UH)
12. National Heritage Language Resource Center (UCLA)
13. National K-12 Foreign Language Resource Center (ISU)
14. National Middle East Language Resource Center (BYU)
15. South Asia Language Resource Center (UC)

== 2010-2013 grant cycle (15 LRCs were funded) ==
1. Center for Advanced Language Proficiency Education and Research (Penn State)
2. Center for Advanced Research on Language Acquisition (U of M)
3. Center for Applied Second Language Studies (UO)
4. Center for Educational Resources in Culture, Language and Literacy (UA)
5. Center for Languages of the Central Asian Region (IU)
6. Center for Language Education and Research) (MSU)
7. Center for Open Educational Resources & Language Learning, (UT Austin)
8. Language Acquisition Resource Center (SDSU)
9. National African Language Resource Center (IU)
10. National Capital Language Resource Center (GU, GWU, & CAL)
11. National East Asian Language Resource Center (OSU)
12. National Foreign Language Resource Center (UH)
13. National Heritage Language Resource Center (UCLA & UCCLLT)
14. National Middle East Language Resource Center (BYU)
15. Slavic and East European Language Research Center (Duke)

== 2014-2017 grant cycle (15 LRCs were funded) ==
1. AELRC (Assessment and Evaluation Language Resource Center, Georgetown University (Georgetown) and Center for Applied Linguistics (CAL)
2. CALPER (Center for Advanced Language Proficiency Education and Research, Pennsylvania State University (Penn State)
3. CASLS (Center for Applied Second Language Studies), University of Oregon (UO)
4. CERCLL (Center for Educational Resources in Culture, Language and Literacy) University of Arizona (UA)
5. CILC (Center for Integrated Language Communities) (CUNY)
6. CeLCAR (Center for Languages of the Central Asian Region), Indiana University (IU)
7. CLEAR (Center for Language Education and Research) (MSU)
8. COERLL (Center for Open Educational Resources & Language Learning), The University of Texas at Austin (UT Austin)
9. CULTR (Center for Urban Language Teaching and Research) Georgia State University (GSU)
10. NALRC (National African Language Resource Center), Indiana University (IU)
11. NEALRC (National East Asian Languages Resource Center) Ohio State University (OSU)
12. NFLRC (National Foreign Language Resource Center) University of Hawaii (UH)
13. NHLRC (National Heritage Language Resource Center), University of California, Los Angeles (UCLA) & UC Consortium for Language Learning and Teaching
14. NRCAL (National Resource Center for Asian Languages), California State University, Fullerton (CSUF)
15. SEELRC (Slavic and East European Language Research Center), Duke University

== 2018-2021 grant cycle (16 LRCS were funded) ==
1. AELRC (Assessment and Evaluation Language Resource Center, Georgetown University (Georgetown) and Center for Applied Linguistics (CAL)
2. CALPER (Center for Advanced Language Proficiency Education and Research, Pennsylvania State University (Penn State)
3. CASLS (Center for Applied Second Language Studies), University of Oregon (UO)
4. CeLCAR (Center for Languages of the Central Asian Region), Indiana University (IU)
5. CERCLL (Center for Educational Resources in Culture, Language and Literacy) University of Arizona (UA)
6. COERLL (Center for Open Educational Resources & Language Learning), The University of Texas at Austin (UT Austin)
7. CULTR (Center for Urban Language Teaching and Research) Georgia State University (GSU)
8. L2TReC (Second Language Teaching and Research Center), University of Utah (UU)
9. NALRC (National African Language Resource Center), Indiana University (IU)
10. NEALRC (National East Asian Languages Resource Center) Ohio State University (OSU)
11. NFLRC (National Foreign Language Resource Center) University of Hawaii (UH)
12. NHLRC (National Heritage Language Resource Center), University of California, Los Angeles (UCLA) & UC Consortium for Language Learning and Teaching
13. NRCAL (National Resource Center for Asian Languages), California State University, Fullerton (CSUF)
14. OLRC (Open Language Resource Center), University of Kansas (KU)
15. PEARLL (Professionals in Education Advancing Research and Language Learning), University of Maryland, College Park (UMD)
16. SEELRC (Slavic and East European Language Research Center), Duke University (Duke)

== 2022-2026 grant cycle (16 LRCS were funded) ==
1. AELRC (Assessment and Evaluation Language Resource Center, Georgetown University (Georgetown) and Center for Applied Linguistics (CAL)
2. CALPER (Center for Advanced Language Proficiency Education and Research, Pennsylvania State University (Penn State)
3. CARLA (Center for Advanced Research on Language Acquisition), University of Minnesota
4. CASLS (Center for Applied Second Language Studies), University of Oregon (UO)
5. CEDAR (Curricular Enhancement, Development, Access, and Research), University of Cincinnati
6. CeLCAR (Center for Languages of the Central Asian Region), Indiana University (IU)
7. CERCLL (Center for Educational Resources in Culture, Language and Literacy) University of Arizona (UA)
8. CULTR (Center for Urban Language Teaching and Research) Georgia State University (GSU)
9. CILC (Center for Integrated Language Communities), City University of New York (CUNY)
10. NALRC (National African Language Resource Center), Indiana University (IU)
11. NFLRC (National Foreign Language Resource Center), University of Hawaiʻi at Mānoa (UHM)
12. NHLRC (National Heritage Language Resource Center), University of California, Los Angeles (UCLA) & UC Consortium for Language Learning and Teaching
13. NLRC (National Less Commonly Taught Languages Resource Center), Michigan State University (MSU)
14. NRCAL (National Resource Center for Asian Languages), California State University, Fullerton (CSUF)
15. PEARLL (Professionals in Education Advancing Research and Language Learning), University of Maryland, College Park (UMD)
16. SEELRC (Slavic and East European Language Research Center), Duke University (Duke)
