= Language immersion =

Use of two languages across a variety of educational subjects

Language immersion, or simply immersion, is a technique used in bilingual language education in which two languages are used for instruction in a variety of topics, including maths, science, or social studies. The languages used for instruction are referred to as the L1 and the L2 for each student, with L1 being the student's native language and L2 being the second language to be acquired through immersion programs and techniques. There are different types of language immersion that depend on the age of the students, the classtime spent in L2, the subjects that are taught, and the level of participation by the speakers of L1.

Although programs differ by country and context, most language immersion programs have the overall goal of promoting bilingualism between the two different sets of language-speakers. In many cases, biculturalism is also a goal for speakers of the majority language (the language spoken by the majority of the surrounding population) and the minority language (the language that is not the majority language). Research has shown that such forms of bilingual education provide students with overall greater language comprehension and production of the L2 in a native-like manner, especially greater exposure to other cultures and the preservation of languages, particularly heritage languages.

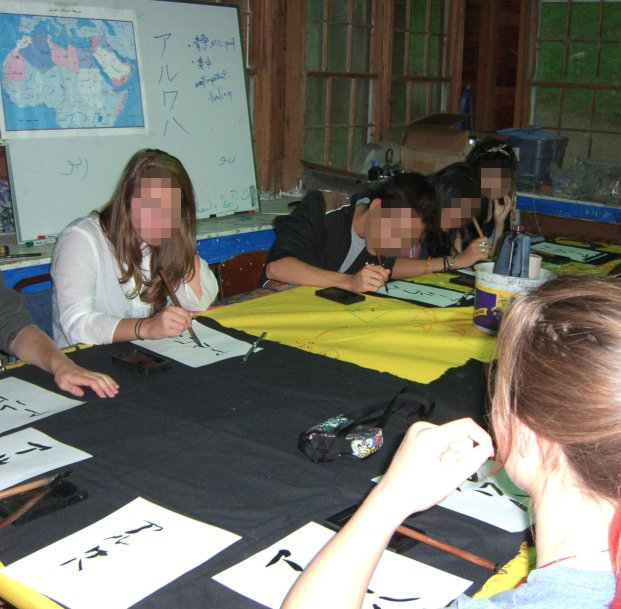
The Arabic Al-Waha at Vergas, Minnesota, and Japanese Mori no Ike at Dent, Minnesota camps of Concordia Language Villages perform a cultural exchange evening program, in which the Arab villagers learn Japanese and a bit of calligraphy through Japanese-language immersion.

== Background ==
Bilingual education has taken on a variety of different approaches outside the traditional sink-or-swim model of full submersion in an L2 without assistance in the L1. According to the Center for Applied Linguistics (CAL), in 1971, there were only three immersion programs within the United States. As of 2011, there were 448 language immersion schools in the US, with the three main immersion languages of instruction being Spanish (45%), French (22%), and Mandarin (13%).

The first French-language immersion program in Canada, with the target language being taught as an instructional language, started in Quebec in 1965. Since the majority language in Quebec is French, English-speaking parents wanted to ensure that their children could achieve a high level of French as well as English in Quebec. Since then, French immersion has spread across the country and has led to the situation of French immersion becoming the most common form of language immersion in Canada so far. According to the survey by CAL in 2011, there are over 528 immersion schools in the US. Besides, language immersion programs have spread to Australia, Mainland China, Saudi Arabia, Japan and Hong Kong, which altogether offer more than 20 languages. The survey also showed that Spanish is the most common immersion language in language immersion programs in US. There are over 239 Spanish-language immersion programs in the US because of immigration from Spanish-speaking countries. The other two common immersion language programs in the US are French and Mandarin, which have 114 and 71 language immersion programs, respectively.

== Types of learners ==
Types of language immersion can be characterized by the total time students spend in the program and also by the students' age.

Types that are characterized by learning time:

- Total immersion: In total immersion, the language of instruction is the students' L2, meaning that students spent 100% of the school day in their L2. Some students find it difficult to understand more abstract and complex concepts when they are taught only via their L2.
- Partial immersion: In partial immersion programs, classtime is shared between the students' L1 and L2. In most cases, it is an even split of time between the languages. Some students prefer this type of language immersion.
- Two-way immersion: This type, which is also called bilingual immersion, is a way to integrate both students of the minority language and students of the majority language into the same classroom with the goal of academic excellence and bilingual proficiency for both student groups. In this type of language immersion, the instructional languages can be two languages, but only one language is used at a time. Students learn languages by the interaction with their peers and teachers. This method of language immersion is popular in America.

Types that are characterized by age:

- Early immersion: Students start learning their second language at the age of 5 or 6.
- Middle immersion: Students start learning their second language at the age of around 9 or 10.
- Late immersion: Students start learning their second language after the age of 11.

The stages of immersion can also be divided into:

- Early total immersion: education in L2 at 90-100%, usually beginning in kindergarten or on first grade.
- Early partial immersion: education in L2 at 50%, usually beginning in kindergarten or on first grade.
- Middle (or delayed) total immersion: education in L2 at 90%, usually beginning on fourth grade.
- Middle (or delayed) partial immersion: education in L2 at 50%, usually beginning on fourth grade.
- Late total immersion: education in L2 at 80%, usually beginning on sixth or seventh grade.
- Late partial immersion: education in L2 at 50%, usually beginning on sixth or seventh grade.

== Types of instruction ==
- In foreign language experience or exploratory (FLEX) programs, students are exposed to a different language(s) and culture(s) in the classroom. A small percentage of class time is spent sampling one or more languages and/or learning about language and so proficiency in the target language is not the primary goal. The goals of the program are to develop careful listening skills, cultural and linguistic awareness, and interest in foreign languages for future language study, as well as to learn basic words and phrases in one or more foreign languages.
- In foreign language in the elementary schools (FLES) programs, students focus on listening, reading, writing and speaking in the target language. In contrast to FLEX programs, proficiency in the target language is the primary goal, but a secondary goal is to expose students to the foreign language’s culture.
- In submersion programs, bilingual students generally receive all of their instruction in their L2. Such programs are often referred to sink-or-swim programs because there is little support for the students' L1.
- In two-way immersion programs, also called dual- or bilingual immersion, the student population consists of speakers of two or more languages. Two-way immersion programs in the US promote L1 speakers of a language other than English to maintain that language as well as to teach English as a second language (ESL). In addition, such programs allow L1 speakers of English to be immersed in a “foreign language acquisition environment.”
- In early-exit programs, bilingual students transition from a bilingual program to a mainstream classroom at an early age (around 7 or 8). Such programs are supported by the belief that bilingual children will benefit the most from transitioning into a mainstream classroom as early as possible.
- In late-exit programs, bilingual students transition from a bilingual program to a mainstream classroom at a later age (around 10 or 11). Such programs are supported by the belief that bilingual children will do better academically from being supported in both languages.

=== Location ===
People may also relocate temporarily to receive language immersion, which occurs when they move to a place (within their native country or abroad) where their native language is not the majority language of that community. For example, Canadian anglophones go to Quebec (see Explore and Katimavik), and Irish anglophones go to the Gaeltacht. Often, that involves a homestay with a family that speaks only the target language. Children whose parents emigrate to a new country also find themselves in an immersion environment with respect to their new language. Another method is to create a temporary environment in which the target language predominates, as in linguistic summer camps like the "English villages" in South Korea and parts of Europe.

Study abroad can also provide a strong immersion environment to increase language skills. However, many factors may affect immersion during study abroad, including the amount of foreign-language contact during the program. To impact competence in the target language positively, Celeste Kinginger notes, research about language learning during study abroad suggests "a need for language learners' broader engagement in local communicative practices, for mindfulness of their situation as peripheral participants, and for more nuanced awareness of language itself.”

== Implementation ==
The task of organizing and creating such a program can be daunting and problematic, with everything from planning to district budget posing issues. One method of implementation proposed by the Center for Advanced Research on Language Acquisition is a phase-in method, which starts with the lowest year participating in the program as the only year and adds a new grade of students into the program each year, working up towards high school. This slow incorporation of an immersion program is useful for schools with limited funding and those who are skeptical about the benefits of such a program because it allows for yearly evaluation and, if it were to fail from the beginning, the impact of the loss is less significant.

The method of implementation is crucial to the success of the program, as the RAND Institute has concluded that the final result of these programs is positive, but only so long as implemented correctly, meaning consistency and strict adherence to the curriculum in the classroom.

== Stages of language acquisition ==
- Pre-production: also called "the silent period," this period lasts 10 hours to 6 months in language immersion environment. Students may have about 500 receptive words in their mind but cannot speak the language yet. During this mimicking period, students are likely to repeat everything that they heard in class and can respond to pictures and yes-or-no questions by using their gestures like nodding or shaking their head. The class must integrate pictures and physical response methods.
- Early Production, in which students can master about 1000 receptive and active words, lasts six months after the pre-production stage. Students can answer simple questions, like yes-or-no questions. They also can repeat and use two-word phrases. They might not use patterns correctly, but they can discover the problem. This is a self-discovery period.
- Speech Emergence, in which students will have about 3000 active words, lasts one year after the early production stage. Students can answer simple questions and use three or more words in simple phrase and patterns. Students can understand the general idea of a story with pictures and may not be able to use the patterns correctly, but they can correct some of them by themselves. This is also called a self-correcting period. Teachers focus on conversations in class during this stage.
- Intermediate Fluency, in which students have nearly 6000 words in their active vocabulary. This stage lasts one year after speech emergence. Students start to use complex sentences in their speaking and writing and also know how to respond to other people's questions. It is not hard for them to use the target language to learn math and science. Students are beginning to use more complex sentences when they speak and write, and they are willing to express opinions and share their thoughts. They ask questions to clarify what they are learning in class. More culture and literature is taught in this stage.
- Advanced Fluency (also called Continued Language Development), which requires students to know most content area vocabulary, lasts from 4 to 10 years. It is an achievement of cognitive academic language proficiency in the target language. Students' second-language ability has arrived to become near the native level.

== Outcomes ==
Studies have shown that students who study a foreign language in school, especially those who start in elementary school, tend to receive higher standardized test scores than students who have not studied a foreign language in school. According to additional research, learning another language can also help students do better in math, focusing, and remembering. Students who study foreign languages also tend to have increased mental capabilities, such as creativity and higher-order thinking skills (see cognitive advantages of bilingualism) and have advantages in the workplace, such as higher salary and a wider range of opportunities, since employers are increasingly seeking workers with knowledge of different languages and cultures. Bilingual immersion programs are intended to foster proficiency or fluency in multiple languages and therefore maximize these benefits. Even if fluency in the desired language is not fully attained, bilingual immersion programs provide a strong foundation for fluency later in life and help students gain appreciation of languages and cultures other than their own.

There are no long-term adverse effects of bilingual education on the learning of the majority language, regardless of whether the students' first language (L1) is a majority or a minority language or of the organization of the educational program. Several observed outcomes of bilingual education are the transfer of academic and conceptual knowledge across both languages, greater success in programs that emphasize biliteracy as well as bilingualism, and better developed second-language (L2) literary skills for minority students than if they received a monolingual education in the majority language.

Language immersion programs with the goal of fostering bilingualism, Canada's French-English bilingual immersion program being one of the first, initially reported that students receive standardized test scores that are slightly below average. That was true in Canada's program, but by Grade 5, there was no difference between their scores and the scores of students who were instructed only in English. The English spelling abilities soon matched those of the English-only students. Ultimately, students did not lose any proficiency in English and were able to develop native-like proficiency in French reading and comprehension but they did not quite reach native-like proficiency in spoken and written French. However, the immersion program is seen as providing a strong foundation for oral French fluency later in life, and other similar programs that might not fully reach their projected goals may also be seen in the same light.

Programs with the goal of preserving heritage languages, such as Hawaii's language immersion program, have also reported initial outcomes of below-average test scores on standardized tests. However, the low test scores may not have been caused by purely language-related factors. For example, there was initially a lack of curriculum material written in Hawaiian, and many of the teachers were inexperienced or unaccustomed to teaching in Hawaiian. Despite the initial drawbacks, the Hawaiian program was overall successful in preserving Hawaiian as a heritage language, with students in the program being able to speak Hawaiian fluently while they learned reading, writing, and math, which were taught in Hawaiian.

Partial immersion programs do not have the initial lag in achievement of the programs of Canada and Hawaii but are less effective than full immersion programs, and students generally do not achieve native-like L2 proficiency.

== Issues ==
=== The design of exposure time for each language ===
The first issue is the allocation of time given to each language. Educators have thought that more exposure to the students' L2 will lead to greater L2 proficiency, but it is difficult for students to learn abstract and complex concepts only by L2. Different types of language immersion schools allocate different time to each language, but there is still no evidence to prove that any particular way is best.

=== The challenges of curriculum, instruction, and instructors ===
In the United States, state and local government only provide curriculum for teaching students in only one language. There is no standard curriculum for language-immersion schools.

Besides, the states do not provide assistance in how to promote biliteracy. Bilingual teaching has been too little researched. The report of the Council of the Great City Schools in 2013 has shown that half of the city schools lack professional bilingual teaching instructors.

=== Bilingual proficiency ===
There are challenges to developing high proficiency in two languages or balance in bilingual skills, especially for early immersion students. Children complete the development of their first language by the age 7, and L1 and L2 affect each other during language development. High levels of bilingual proficiency are hard to achieve. Students with more exposure are better. For second-language immersion schools, immersion too early in a second language leads students to fail to be proficient in their first language.

== By country ==
=== Canada ===
As of 2009, about 300,000 Canadian students (roughly 6% of the school population) were enrolled in immersion programs. In early immersion, L1 English-speakers are immersed in French in their education for 2 to 3 years prior to formal English education. This early exposure prepares Canadian L1 English speakers for the 4th grade, when they begin to be instructed in English 50% of the time and French the other 50%.

=== United States ===
In the United States and since the 1980s, dual immersion programs have grown for a number of reasons: competition in a global economy, a growing population of second-language learners, and the successes of previous programs. Language immersion classes can now be found throughout the US, in urban and suburban areas, in dual-immersion and single-language immersion, and in an array of languages. As of May 2005, there were 317 dual immersion programs in US elementary schools, providing instruction in 10 languages, and 96% of those programs were in Spanish.

==== Hawaii ====
The 1970s marked the beginning of bilingual education programs in Hawaii. The Hawaiian Language Program was geared to promote cultural integrity by emphasizing native-language proficiency through heritage language bilingual immersion instruction. By 1995, there were 756 students enrolled in the Hawaiian Language Immersion Program from K to 8. The program was taught strictly in Hawaiian until Grades 5 and 6, when English was introduced as the language of instruction for one hour per day. The Hawaiian Language immersion Program is still in effect today for K-12. With an emphasis on language revival, Hawaiian is the main medium of instruction until Grade 5, when English is introduced but does not usurp Hawaiian as the main medium of instruction.

=== Mexico ===
A study by Hamel (1995) highlights a school in Michoacan, Mexico, which focuses on two bilingual elementary schools in which teachers built a curriculum that taught all subjects, including literature and math, in the children’s L1: P’urhepecha. Years after the curriculum was implemented in 1995, researchers conducted a study comparing L1 P’urhepecha students with L1 Spanish students. Results found that students who had acquired L1 P’urhepecha literacy performed better in both languages (P’urhepecha and Spanish) than students who were L1 Spanish literate.

=== New Zealand ===
New Zealand shows another instance of heritage bilingual immersion programs. Established in 1982, full Māori-language immersion education strictly forbids the use of English in classroom instruction even though English is typically the students' L1. That has created challenges for educators because of the lack of tools and underdeveloped bilingual teaching strategy for Māori.

=== Malawi and Zambia ===
A study by Williams (1996) looked at the effects bilingual education had on two different communities in Malawi and Zambia. In Malawi, Chichewa is the main language of instruction, and English is taught as a separate course. In Zambia, English is the main language of instruction, and the local language, Nyanja, is taught as a separate course. Williams's study took children from six schools in each country in Grade 5. He administered two tests: an English-language reading test, and a mother-tongue reading test. One result showed that there was no significant difference in the English reading ability between the Zambian and Malawian school children. However, there were significant differences in the proficiency of mother tongue reading ability. The results of the study showed that the Malawian students did better in their mother tongue, Chichewa, than Zambian children did in their mother tongue, Nyanja.

== See also ==
- Bilingual education
- Direct method (education)
- English village
- French immersion
- Gaelscoileanna, Irish language immersion
- Kura Kaupapa Māori, Maori language immersion
- Multilingualism
- Native Language Immersion Student Achievement Act
- Ulpan, Hebrew language immersion
