= Post-graduate service =

Post-graduate service (or post-graduate volunteering) is a range of commitments that people who have recently graduated with a college degree can make to volunteer in a community in need. Discussed within the setting of colleges and universities, post-graduate service is seen as an alternative to entering the workforce or going to a graduate or professional school.

A post-graduate volunteer works for a non-profit organization on a full-time and long-term basis. Non-profits can have internal programs for taking on such volunteers. But what is more commonly meant by "post-graduate service" is when graduates interested in service of this kind become applicants to broader programs that have relationships with multiple (in the case of AmeriCorps, thousands of) non-profits. These programs, upon accepting the graduate, "place" him or her with a non-profit. The placement can resemble paid employment and usually demands a commitment of one (or two) year(s).

== Terminology ==
In wider circles, the terms “service” and “volunteering” tend to be invoked when the person is unpaid. Thus, here they are used somewhat differently, as many who engage in post-graduate service are given stipends or are compensated. There are programs that care to address this—by referring to their participants as “members” and not “volunteers.” There are also some programs designed for recently graduated students, such as Teach For America, that have certain similarities to post-graduate service but offer members more than mere compensation but full salaries and thus are not generally considered post-graduate service. However, with post-graduate service being an umbrella term that has meaning insofar as university students and staff members use it and find it helpful, these exclusions and exceptions are not highly significant.

== Variations in post-graduate service ==
The organizations that fit this umbrella term—i.e., that take on post-graduate volunteers, either for their own use or to place with separate non-profits—differ in several important ways.

=== Governmental character ===
The United States federal government has launched its own programs aimed at putting volunteers in places within the country or in the world that have been identified as needful of such service. The Corporation for National and Community Service was established in 1993, and while it takes volunteers of all ages across multiple programs, its AmeriCorps program is an option that many recent college graduates choose. Meanwhile, the Peace Corps has been in existence since 1961, placing volunteers in (among other contexts) third-world poverty, that they might be partner to local communities efforts at self-improvement. With these programs understood to be “governmental post-graduate service”, most of the rest of what is considered post-graduate service is non-governmental.

=== Location ===
Some organizations put volunteers in domestic service, others in international service (here “domestic” refers to the United States of America). In addition to the Peace Corps, examples of international post-graduate service programs would be Jesuit Volunteer Corps International and Good Shepherd Volunteers International. Domestic programs include City Year and Loretto Volunteers. Parallelistically, non-profit organizations that have their own programs for taking on full-time volunteers which are domestic include Nazareth Farm and Amate House. Non-profits that have their own programs for taking on full-time volunteers which are international include Farm of the Child and Working Boys’ Center.

=== Religious character ===
Organizations can differ in their religious character. Some programs are entirely secular (or, non-faith-based) and some are faith-based, including being affiliated with religions, denominations, or religious institutes. Many organizations that would be called post-graduate service programs are in fact the lay missioner/volunteer arm of a particular religious institute or society of apostolic life. This includes some programs already named, as well as the Augustinian Volunteers, Good Shepherd Volunteers, Dominican Volunteers, Maryknoll Lay Missioners, Cabrini Mission Corps (Cabrini Sisters), and Little Sisters of the Assumption Family in Mission (Little Sisters of the Assumption).

=== Housing ===
A post-graduate volunteer’s housing and living situation varies greatly across programs. Some volunteer residences would qualify as intentional community. In such cases, volunteers may not be expected to contribute to housing costs, as when the house belongs to or is paid for by the post-graduate service program. In other cases, volunteers are expected to procure their own housing.

=== Programs' values and philosophies ===
Some differences lie in program philosophies. Many organizations that place or take volunteers have distinct approaches to service, often integrating their understandings of service with values or “pillars” that present their vision of how a volunteer (or a person generally) should live. For instance, the Jesuit Volunteer Corps identifies its “values” as social justice, community, spirituality, and simple living. An integrated approach to service means living out these values and includes specific actions for the volunteers that speak to them and build on them.

== Post-graduate service on college campuses ==
Colleges and universities in the United States can occasionally be found to have structures in place, or particular staff members, who—like career development departments—aid interested students in their search for the right service program. The Catholic Volunteer Network (formerly called the Catholic Network of Volunteer Service) is made up of 200 member organizations that take post-graduate volunteers. Many of these organizations report to CVN the colleges and universities from which their volunteers come, such that CVN can publicize which colleges are sending the most students into volunteering positions within their network. In previous rank orderings, the University of Notre Dame has topped CVN’s list.

== Post-graduate service and future graduate studies ==
Post-graduate service is chosen by a person when she or he has just acquired a degree and, because it is a full-time commitment, thus precludes immediate entrance to a more advanced degree program. For this reason, many do post-graduate service with an interest in going to graduate school upon their return. To this point, CNVS membership surveys from 2001-2006 reported that a third of all returning full-time volunteers followed their period of service with graduate-level studies This approach acts on the hope that the experience of long-term service—particularly experience in building relationships with the poor (should that be present)—makes one a more visibly mature, independent, and determined applicant.
