= Center for Applied Linguistics =

U.S. nonprofit organization

The Center for Applied Linguistics (CAL) is a private, nonprofit organization founded in 1959 and headquartered in Washington, DC. Its mission is to promote language learning and cultural understanding. Its president and chief executive officer is Diep Nguyen.

The organization carries out its mission by working in the fields of bilingual education, English as a second language, world languages education, language policy, assessment, immigrant and refugee integration, literacy dialect studies; and the education of linguistically and culturally diverse adults and children. Staff members conduct research, design and develop language assessments and instructional materials, provide technical assistance and professional development, and disseminate information and resources related to language and culture.

== History ==
In the late 1950s, issues of language diversity, interest in language policy, and the emergence of English as a world language created a demand for information about world languages and for expertise in linguistics and language training. In the United States, reactions to the launch of Sputnik and the continuation of the Cold War led to concern about the ability of US schools to train students in mathematics, the sciences, and foreign languages. CAL was created in this environment of increased interest in language issues by Dr. Charles A. Ferguson, a pioneer in the field of applied linguistics. Through a grant from the Ford Foundation to the Modern Language Association, CAL was established in 1959 to serve as a liaison between the academic world of linguistics, and the practical world of language education and language-related concerns. The original mandate of CAL was to improve the teaching of English around the world; encourage the teaching and learning of less commonly taught languages; contribute new knowledge to the field by conducting language research to resolve social and educational problems; and serve as a clearinghouse for information collection, analysis, and dissemination and as a coordinating agency to bring together scholars and practitioners involved in language-related issues.

== Current activities ==
Since its inception, CAL has played a leading role in conducting research on language use, language learning, and effective teaching methods, and translating research into practical applications to help language learners succeed. Among the populations that CAL serves are language educators of children and adults who are learning foreign languages and English as a second language; immigrants and refugees in the United States and the agencies that provide services for them; schools, school districts, and other educational institutions in need of curriculum development, professional development, and assessments; and policy makers who need information about language and culture to address the important issues of the day.

== See also ==
- Applied linguistics
- English as a foreign or second language
- Language assessment
- Language education
- Linguistics
- Multilingualism
- Second language acquisition
- TOEFL
- World languages
