= Language education in the United States =

Language education in the United States has historically involved teaching English to immigrants; and Spanish, French, Latin, Italian or German to native English speakers. Bilingual education was sponsored in some districts, often continuously. Japanese language education in the United States increased following the Japanese post-war economic miracle. To participate, the government increased funding to teaching Japanese in schools. Chinese as a second language began to be taught more frequently in response to the reform and opening of the People's Republic of China; this has included funding from the PRC Government. In the aftermath of the September 11 terrorist attacks, US Senator Norm Coleman called Arabic "the next strategic language".

Less Commonly Taught Languages (LCTLs) is a designation used for languages other than Spanish, French, and German, the three most commonly taught foreign languages in US public schools.

== Language as defined in education ==
Language is traditionally defined as a way of communicating through vocalizations, symbols, or movements. In a classroom, this definition had to become stricter to define guidelines for what can and cannot be taught. Language, in this circumstance was given a set of guidelines that stated it must be productive, have the ability to produce an infinite number of sentences that cover every available topic, and introduces, uses, and relates symbols, This definition also needed to be broadened to accommodate for the thousands of different dialects in every given language. This was needed because every person possesses a unique dialect that slightly varies from others. This standard allows for the grouping of dialects into groups. These groups make up a "language" such as English, Spanish, and French. Language in classrooms in generalized into one category to offer and exposes students to the basics and variety. Some classrooms may focus on one area on a "language" while others show multiple aspects of each one.

== Rise of multilingualism ==
There has been an increased need for people who have experience with languages other than English in the United States. There are a few ways that foreign language has been taught in schools. The first method is language immersion programs which is when the beginning of the students school career is done in the second language and then later on the child would be taught in English. The second method is bilingual education which is when subjects are taught in both English and their mother tongue.

== See also ==
- List of most commonly learned second languages in the United States
- Education in the United States
- French language in the United States
- German language in the United States
- Spanish language in the United States
- Italian language in the United States
- Bilingual Education Act of 1968
- Foreign policy of the United States
- Language education
- List of communities in the United States where English isn't the majority language spoken at home
