= Less Commonly Taught Languages =

Languages seldom taught in US public schools

Less Commonly Taught Languages (LCTLs) is a designation used in the United States for languages other than the most commonly taught foreign languages in US public schools. The term covers a wide array of world languages (other than the English language), ranging from some of the world's largest and most influential, and holds international recognization such as Chinese, Russian, Arabic, Bengali, Hindi, Portuguese, Japanese, Persian, Urdu, Turkish, Swahili, Italian, and Tamil to smaller regional languages studied in the US mainly by area experts, such as Twi, spoken in West Africa, and Finnish.

The term arose out of a need to contrast the more commonly taught languages in US K-12 public education with those normally encountered only at university level, a great divide reflected both in the US textbook industry, which caters to the existing K-12 market by necessarily focusing on the "Big Three," (Spanish, French and German) and in historical US government funding for foreign language education. (In fact, one Stanford University language educator has referred to LCTLs as the "Less Commonly Funded Languages".) To facilitate the development of instructional formats specifically for the low-enrollment languages at U.S. colleges/universities, the National Association of Self-Instructional Language Programs (NASILP) was established in the 1970s.

After 9/11, US federal departments and agencies recognized the strategic importance of LCTLs such as Arabic and, as a result, have begun funding programs for LCTLs such as the National Flagship Language Initiative (NFLI) under the auspices of the National Security Education Program (NSEP). These programs have been developed to encourage growth in the teaching of less commonly taught languages critical to national security such as Arabic, Persian, Hindi, Korean, Mandarin Chinese, and Russian.

Within the US academic/educational community, previously informal links among LCTL educators crystallized into the National Council of Less Commonly Taught Languages (or NCOLCTL), "an umbrella organization for national associations and individuals interested in less commonly taught languages" founded in 1990 and based at the Indiana University Bloomington.

The Council's mission is to increase the number of Americans who choose to learn one or more of the less commonly taught languages (LCTLs) as a means of enhancing cross-cultural communication among citizens of the United States . ... The Council seeks to improve the teaching and learning of these languages and to make them more generally available. The Council is the national voice for organizations and individuals who represent the teaching of these less commonly taught languages at both the collegiate and precollegiate level . ... The Council constitutes a national mechanism devoted to strengthening the less commonly taught language professions through enabling Council members to work toward "shared solutions to common problems." The Council principally directs its efforts toward building a national architecture for the LCTL field and in making the field's resources easily accessible to language programs and individual learners around the United States.

Other places that provide support for LCTLs are the National Language Resource Centers (United States), all of which focus on LCTLs in at least some capacity. One of these centers, The National Less Commonly Taught Languages Resource Center at Michigan State University is working on projects to support LCTLs, including professional development opportunities for instructors and open resources that can be used in classrooms.

Another Language Resource Center, the Center for Advanced Research on Language Acquisition (CARLA), at the University of Minnesota has had many projects over the years that focus on LCTLs The LCTL project (no longer updated) created a large database of where LCTLs are taught in North American colleges/universities, k-12 schools, distance education, study abroad, and summer courses. Over 350 languages and thousands of schools were listed on the database. In addition to the database, the LCTL project sponsored mailing lists for teachers of various LCTLs, royalty free graphics and sounds for language teachers, and a summer institute on developing material for LCTL teachers.

In Europe, the term Lesser-Used Languages (LULs) is used by the European Union (EU) bureaucracy for languages other than the 24 "official" languages of the European Union: Bulgarian, Croatian, Czech, Danish, Dutch, English, Estonian, Finnish, French, German, Greek, Hungarian, Irish, Italian, Latvian, Lithuanian, Maltese, Polish, Portuguese, Romanian, Slovak, Slovene, Spanish, and Swedish.

== See also ==
- List of most commonly learned foreign languages in the United States
- Language education in the United States
- Foreign policy of the United States
- Languages Other Than English
- Critical Language Scholarship (CLS) Program
