= High school diploma =

Diploma awarded for completing high school

A high school diploma (occasionally referred to as a high school degree) is a diploma awarded upon graduation of high school. A high school diploma is awarded after completion of courses of studies lasting four years, from grade 9 to grade 12. It is the school leaving qualification in the United States and Canada.

The diploma is awarded by the school in accordance with the requirements of the local state or provincial government. Requirements for earning the diploma vary by jurisdiction, and there may be different requirements for different streams or levels of high school graduation. Typically they include a combination of selected coursework meeting specified criteria for a particular stream and acceptable passing grades earned on the state exit examination.

== Diplomas in specific jurisdictions ==
=== Canada ===
Each province issues their own high school diploma. As in the US, there is no federal control of education in Canada; each province is responsible for its own education system.

==== Alberta ====
In Alberta, the diploma is known as an Alberta High School Diploma. The Alberta High School Diploma is issued in either English or French. Under current regulations from the Government of Alberta, students must earn a minimum of 100 Credits to obtain an Alberta High School Diploma.

The 100 credits required have to include 40 credits from Grade 10, 35 from Grade 11 and 30 from Grade 12.

Individual components of the 100 Credit requirement are English Language Arts - 30 Level, Social Studies 30 Level, Mathematics 20 Level, Science 20 Level, Physical Education 10, Career and Life Management and 10 Credits in any combination from: Career and Technology Studies, Fine Arts, Second Language Courses, Physical Education 20 and/or 30 as well as 10 Credits in any 30-level course (in addition to a 30-level English Language Arts and 30-level Social Studies as above). These 30-Level courses may include 30-level locally developed courses, advanced level (3000 series) in Career and Technology Studies, 30-level Work Experience courses, 30-level Registered Apprenticeship Program courses, 30-level Green Certificate Specialization courses, Special Projects 30.

Alberta is one of three provinces or territories that requires grade 12 examinations as part of the high school diploma requirement: See Standardized testing in Alberta, Northwest Territories, and Nunavut

==== British Columbia ====
In British Columbia, the diploma is known as the British Columbia Certificate of Graduation. The province of BC has two distinct graduation programs: the BC Certificate of Graduation (Dogwood Diploma) and the BC Adult Graduation Diploma (Adult Dogwood). Students also have the opportunity to meet their educational goals (other than graduation) through the BC School Completion Certificate (Evergreen Certificate).

The current Dogwood requirements have been in place since July 1, 2004. Under current regulations, students must earn a minimum of 80 credits to graduate, which must include 48 credits for required courses, a minimum of 28 elective credits, and 4 credits for "graduation transitions", a standards-based assessment evaluated by schools under BC Ministry of Education guidelines. Required courses include, among other things, language arts, social studies, mathematics, and science courses in grades 10, 11, and 12. Part of the evaluation of students includes standardized provincial examinations in a number of the required courses in grades 10 and 12. As part of the 80 credits for the Dogwood, 16 credits must be at the Grade 12 level, and must include English 12 or Communications 12.

==== Ontario ====
In Ontario, the high school diploma is known as the Ontario Secondary School Diploma (OSSD) . The diploma is awarded to all students who complete the standard Ontario educational curriculum. The requirements for the diploma include compulsory credits in English or French, Mathematics, Science, Canadian History, Canadian Geography, Arts, Health and Physical Education, and a second language; compulsory half credits in Career Studies and Civics; one credit each from three elective groups; 12 optional credits, 4 of which may be obtained through dual-credit classes; 40 hours of community service; and the Ontario Secondary School Literacy Test. Those who leave school after completing 14 credits but prior to obtaining the diploma can obtain the Ontario Secondary School Certificate.

==== Quebec ====
Quebec issued the Diplôme des études secondaires (DES - Diploma of Secondary Studies), formerly Quebec Certificate of Education (and sometimes were known Quebec HS Secondary Certificate and Québécois baccalaureat) before it changed into HS Diploma/Diplôme D.E.S. at the end of secondary V (grade 11), for graduation from secondary school (high school), a five-year school spanning secondary I (grade 7) to secondary V (grade 11).

==== Saskatchewan ====
To earn a high school diploma, Saskatchewan students are required to earn a total of 24 credits from grades 10 to 12. For a regular English program diploma, they must earn 5 credits in English Language Arts, 3 credits in Social Studies, 2 credits in mathematics, 2 credits in science, 1 credit in Physical Education/Health Education, 2 credits in Arts Education/Practical and Applied Arts, and 9 elective credits.

=== United States ===
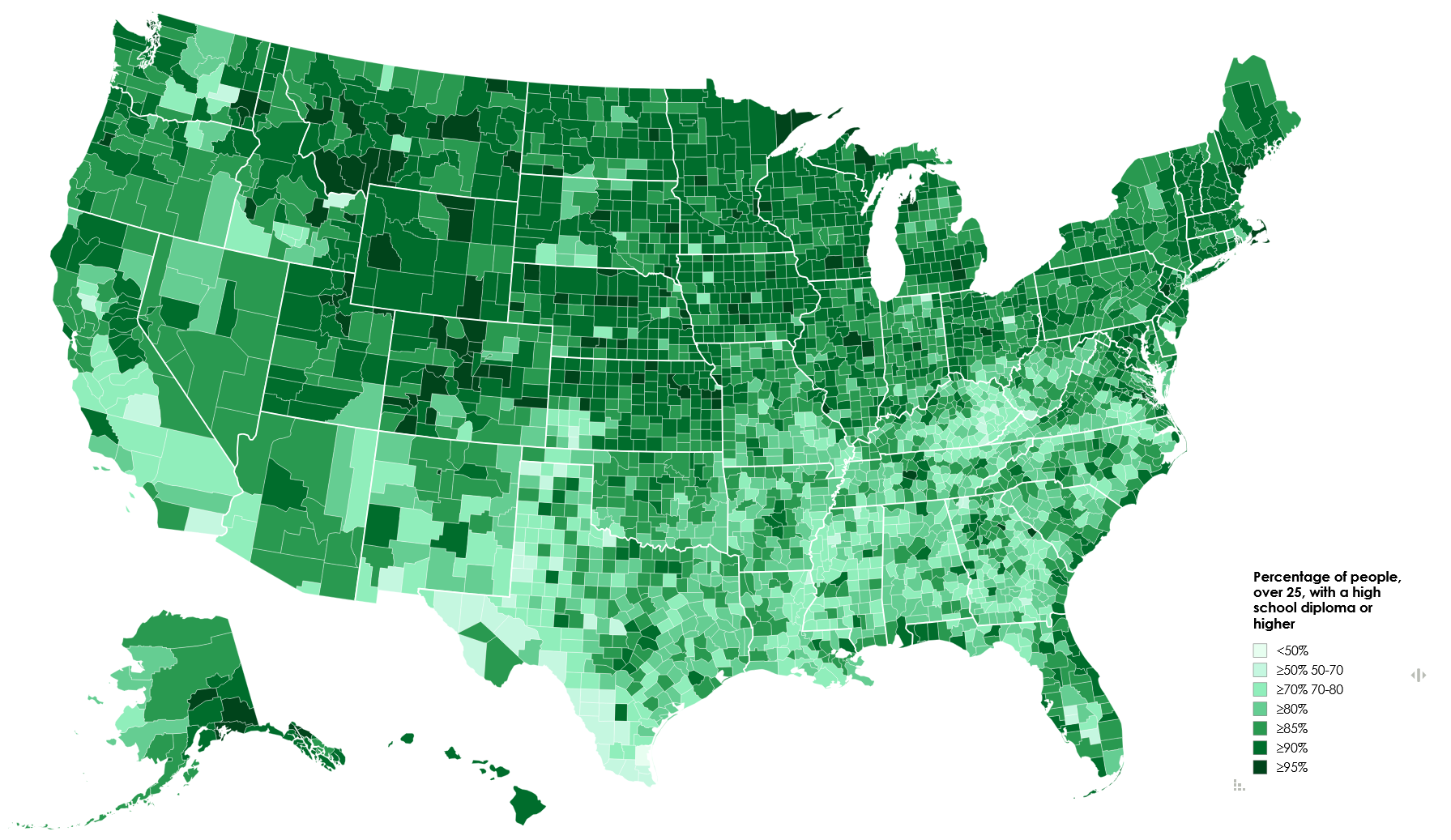
Percentage of people over 25 years old with a high school degree or higher, as of 2018

In the United States, a high school diploma is usually conferred upon the satisfactory completion of schooling encompassing Kindergarten through the 12th grade and is issued by the student's high school.

==== Alabama ====
In Alabama, all students are required to earn 24 credits. The required credit distribution is: English (4 credits), Math (4 credits), Science (4 credits), History (4 credits), PE/JROTC (1 credit), Health (0.5 credits), Career Prep (1 credit), CTE/arts education/Foreign language (3 credits), and Electives (2.5 credits).

County schools offer Honors and AP classes.

==== California ====
In California, students are required to successfully meet the following minimum requirements to earn a high school diploma: 3 years of English, 2 years of Math, 3 years of History/Social Studies including one year of U.S. history and geography; one year of world history, culture, and geography; one semester of American government and civics, and one semester of economics, 2 years of science including biological and physical sciences, 1 year of either visual and performing arts, foreign language, or career technical education, and 2 years of Physical Education. Most schools' individual graduation requirements far outweigh the state's minimum standards.

Beginning in 2005–06, all students must pass the California High School Exit Examination prior to graduation, which is normally first administered in the 10th grade. Since the 2015–16 school year, passing the California High School Exit Examination is no longer a condition of graduation from high school.

==== Illinois ====
In Illinois, students are required to take English, mathematics, science, social science, world language, fine arts, physical education, and elective classes meeting selected criteria as part of the program of study for the High School Diploma. Electives may include advanced courses, career and technical education (CTE), Junior Reserve Officers' Training Corps (JROTC), dual-enrollment, or additional classes in the required subjects that meet school board requirements. An additional requirement was a passing grade on the Prairie State Achievement Examination which was typically taken in Grade 11, prior to being discontinued in 2014.

Accommodations are made for select students with unique needs. English Language Learner (ELL) students may substitute English as a Second Language for English to meet the graduation requirements. Students receiving special education services may complete modified requirements according to an Individualized Education Plan (IEP).

==== North Carolina ====
In North Carolina high school students are required to obtain 24 high school credits, comprised: 4 English credits (English 1, English 2, English 3, and English 4), 4 Math credits (Math 1, Math 2, Math 3, and an elective math course), 3 Science credits (Physics, Biology, and Chemistry), 4 Social Studies credits (Political Science, Economics, History, Geography), and 1 Health or Physical education credit.

Foreign language credits are not generally required for graduation, but a minimum of two credits are required for admission to a UNC system university.

The state offers "foundations" courses for students struggling academically, standard classes, honors and seminar classes for academically advanced students, and Advanced Placement classes, which allow motivated and academically gifted students to obtain college credit while in high school.

The state has 133 Early college high schools which enable students to graduate from high school with an associate degree in a career of their choosing offered by the college which is offering said college courses, or to transfer as juniors to a NC university or possibly earn transferable credit to an out of state or private university.

==== New York ====
In New York State, the high school diploma awarded is known as the Regents Diploma, which is earned upon successful completion of the Regents Exams in the required subjects. Two levels are offered: the standard Regents Diploma and the Regents Diploma with Advanced Designation. Both diplomas require 44 credits, including 8 credits in English, 8 credits in Social Studies, 6 credits in Math, 6 credits in Science, 1 credit in Health, 2 credits in Art or Music, and 4 credits in Physical Education; the Regents Diploma requires 2 credits of Secondary Language and 6 credits in Sequence Courses or Electives, while the Regents Diploma with Advanced Designation requires 6 credits of Secondary Language and 3 credits in Sequence Courses or Electives.

To obtain a Regents Diploma, students are required to achieve passing grades on Regents Exams in Comprehensive English, any one Mathematics course, Global History, US History, any one Science, and Language Other Than English (LOTE). The subjects for which passing grades on the Regents Exams are required for the Regents Diploma with Advanced Designation are Comprehensive English, all 3 Mathematics, Global History, US History, one physical Science, one life Science, and Language Other Than English (LOTE). A passing score is 65 in each subject; the "With Honors" designation is added if the average score in all required exams is 90 or greater. A "Technical Endorsement" is given to students enrolled in a Career and Technical Education (CTE) program who additionally complete an approved technical assessment, a work-based learning experience, and a work-skills employability profile. Students are also able to receive a Mastery in Mathematics and Mastery in Science endorsement, as well as Seal of Biliteracy and a Seal of Civic Readiness.

As a result, the highest level of a New York State Regents diploma is with Honors, Advanced Designation, Mastery of Science, Mastery of Mathematics, with a Technical Endorsement, and both the Seal of Biliteracy and the Seal of Civic Readiness.

==== Texas ====
In Texas, there are three programs offered for graduation: the Minimum High School Program (MHSP), the Recommended High School Program (RHSP), and the Advanced (Distinguished) High School Program (AHSP/DHSP). The Recommended and Distinguished programs are the streams typically chosen by most students, and are expected of students who are college-bound. Also required for graduation is successful completion with passing grades on the Exit Level examination of the State of Texas Assessments of Academic Readiness (STAAR), which is typically taken in Grade 11. Multiple re-takes for the exam are available, in case of failure on a previous attempt.

Students in the Recommended and Distinguished programs must take four years of English, mathematics, science, and social studies classes as part of their program of study. Students in the Distinguished program must also take a minimum amount of advanced-level coursework, which could include Advanced Placement or International Baccalaureate classes or university classes taken as dual-enrollment. Students in the Minimum program have less stringent requirements to complete their diploma than students in the other diploma programs.

By Texas state law, completion of the Recommended or Distinguished programs or a program with an equivalent curriculum and level of rigor, along with suitable scores on the SAT or the ACT, is required for a student to be eligible to be considered for admission to a four-year public institution of higher education in Texas.

== Alternatives ==
=== General Education Development (GED) ===
The General Education Development (GED) credential is offered as an alternative qualification for those who did not successfully earn a high school diploma. Examination involves taking and passing tests in four subjects: Language Arts, Mathematics, Science, and Social Studies. A Certificate of High School Equivalency is generally offered to those who successfully complete the GED. While the GED itself may not necessarily enable the same higher education and employment opportunities as the high school diploma, the GED can enhance employability prospects for former high school dropouts or completed with the high school Certificate of attendance or completion, and progression is available to tertiary study at select higher education institutions.

=== IB Diploma Programme ===
IB World Schools may offer the IB Diploma in lieu of or alongside a traditional high school diploma. The IB Diploma is an academically rigorous program of study. The program of study for the IB Diploma includes subjects chosen from six subject groups: Studies in Language and Literature, Language Acquisition, Individuals and Societies, Sciences, Mathematics, and the Arts. Three subjects are taken at Higher Level, and three are taken at Standard Level. Also included is the Diploma Programme Core, which is composed of Extended Essay; Theory of Knowledge; and Creativity, Action, and Service (CAS) components. The IB Diploma is an internationally recognized academic school-leaving qualification that provides entry to, and in some cases, advanced standing in, university. International Baccalaureate (IB) exams are typically considered equivalent to Advanced Placement (AP) exams and are at an academic level above the high school diploma, and thus university credit may be awarded for successful completion of IB subjects by American and Canadian universities as well as Universities around the World.

=== British qualifications ===
==== International General Certificate of Secondary Education (IGCSE) ====
International schools following the British Curriculum of education may offer the International General Certificate of Secondary Education (IGCSE) qualification, which is considered to be at the same level, in lieu of or alongside a traditional high school diploma. The IGCSE is the international counterpart to the General Certificate of Secondary Education (GCSE) qualification, taken by secondary school students at Key Stage 4 in the United Kingdom. Edexcel and Cambridge International Examinations (CIE) are examination boards which offer the IGCSE qualification worldwide.

Students generally take five to ten subjects, according to their desired program of study and the offerings available at their school; an IGCSE with eight subjects at grades A*-C is considered equivalent to the full high school diploma. Unlike the high school diploma, which is typically studied for in grades 9–12 (years 10–13 in the UK) and awarded in grade 12 (year 13), the IGCSE is typically awarded at grade 10 (year 11 in the UK), after which the A Levels are studied for and awarded.

==== Cambridge Advanced International Certificate of Education (AICE) Diploma ====
Following successful completion of the GCSE or IGCSE, international schools following the British Curriculum may offer the Cambridge Advanced International Certificate of Education (AICE) Diploma, developed by the Cambridge International Examinations board. As part of the Cambridge AICE Diploma program, students take a combination of Cambridge International AS Level and A Level subjects, administered by Cambridge International Examinations with at least one subject taken in each of three subject areas: Mathematics and Science, Languages, and Arts and Humanities; subjects from a fourth subject group, Global Perspecties, may also be chosen. Six credits must be earned to achieve the Diploma; an AS Level counts as a full (single) credit, and an A Level counts as a double credit. The Cambridge AICE Diploma would typically be completed by the final year of high school. AS and A Levels are at a higher academic level than the high school diploma, and thus university credit may be awarded for A Levels completed as part of the Cambridge AICE Diploma by American and Canadian Universities.

==== Access to Higher Education Diploma ====
The Access to Higher Education Diploma is considered equivalent to 3 A Levels, and is made up of 60 credits. 45 of the credits can be obtained at Pass, Merit or Distinction, and the remaining 15 can only be achieved up to a Pass. The Access to Higher Education Diploma is widely used to gain entry into universities, especially by mature students, or any student which lacks qualifications due to an unconventional educational background. Many regard Access to Higher Education Diplomas to be more academically challenging than A Levels.

==== Edexcel International Diploma (ID) ====
As an alternative to the Cambridge AICE Diploma, international schools following the British Curriculum may offer the Edexcel International Diploma (ID), in lieu of or alongside the traditional high school diploma, following successful completion of the GCSE or IGCSE. The International Diploma requires successful completion of three Edexcel A Levels or three BTEC Level 3 Extended Diplomas, along with a Level 3 Extended Project (EPQ), a BTEC Level 3 WorkSkills Plus Certificate, and an Edexcel AS Level in General Studies. This qualification thus allows for a blended mix of academic studies and vocational training, to prepare students for higher education as well as the workplace. The Edexcel International Diploma would typically be completed by the final year of high school. AS and A Levels are at a higher academic level than the high school diploma, and thus university credit may be awarded for A Levels completed as part of the International Diploma by American and Canadian universities.

=== French qualifications ===
==== Baccalauréat (Bac) ====
International schools following the French Curriculum of education may offer the Baccalauréat (Le Bac) in lieu of or alongside a traditional high school diploma. The Baccalauréat is the traditional school-leaving qualification of French schools. The Baccalauréat is offered in several streams; subjects chosen for the Baccalauréat depend on the stream chosen by the student.

==== Baccalauréat Franco Américain (BFA) ====
Accredited French international schools in the United States may also offer the Baccalauréat Franco Américain (French American Baccalauréat), as an alternative to the traditional Baccalauréat, in lieu of or alongside a traditional high school diploma. The French American Baccalauréat is offered as a joint initiative of the College Board and the French Ministry of Education. The curriculum includes Advanced Placement (AP) subjects and French classes; in lieu of three French classes, students take three corresponding AP classes in the première (year 11) and terminale (year 12) years of high school. AP exams are taken in May of year 11 or year 12, and French Baccalauréat exams are taken according to the normal academic calendar. Students may elect to take the Baccalauréat Franco Américain in the Literature (L), Economics (ES), and Science (S) courses of study.

== Recognition ==
=== United Kingdom ===
In England and Wales, the high school diploma is considered to be at the level of the GCSE, which is awarded at Year 11.

As the more academically rigorous A Levels awarded at Year 13 are expected for university admission, Students who wish to study in the United Kingdom may additionally participate in the Advanced Placement (AP) or International Baccalaureate (IB) programs, which are considered to be at the level of the A Level qualifications and earn points on the UCAS Tariff, or may opt to take A Level examinations in British international schools or as private candidates. College Entrance Examination Board (CEEB) tests, such as the SAT, SAT Subject Tests, or the ACT, may also be considered.

The Universities and Colleges Admissions Service (UCAS) recommends that in addition to a high school diploma, grades of 3 or above in at least two, or ideally three, Advanced Placement exams may be considered as meeting general entry requirements for admission. The IB Diploma may also be accepted. For the College Entrance Examination Board tests, a minimum score of 600 or higher in all sections of the SAT or a minimum score of 26 or higher in all sections of the ACT along with a minimum score of 600 in relevant SAT Subject Tests may be considered as meeting general entry requirements for admission.

=== United States and Canada ===
Within the United States and Canada, there is generally universal recognition among employers, colleges, and universities of all officially awarded high school diplomas earned in any jurisdiction.

== See also ==
- Education in Canada
- Secondary education in the United States
