= Reading achievement =

Achievement

Reading achievement has been the subject of considerable research and reporting for decades. Many organizations measure and report on reading achievement for children and adults (e.g., NAEP, PIRLS, PISA, PIAAC, and EQAO).

== By level ==
=== Kindergarten to grade four ===
Researchers have concluded that approximately 95% of students can be taught to read by the end of the first or second year of school, yet in many countries 20% or more do not meet that expectation.

A 2012 study in the U.S. found that 33% of grade three children had low reading scores – however, they comprised 63% of the children who did not graduate from high school. Poverty also had an additional negative impact on high school graduation rates.

According to the 2013 Nation's Report card in the United States, 32% of grade four students failed to perform at or above the Basic Reading Level. By 2019 this had increased to 34%. There was a significant difference by race and ethnicity (e.g., black students at 52% and white students at 23%). See more about the breakdown by ethnicity in 2019 and 2022 here. Following the school closures that resulted from the impact of the COVID-19 pandemic, this increased to 37% in 2022, and by 2024 it was at 40%. It is believed that students who read below the basic level lack sufficient support to complete their schoolwork. This problem is exacerbated because many special education teachers leave the field to move to general education.

According to a 2023 study in California, only 46.6% of grade three students achieved the English reading standards. Another report states that many teenagers who've spent time in California's juvenile detention facilities get high school diplomas with grade-school reading skills. "There are kids getting their high school diplomas who aren't able to even read and write." During a five-year span beginning in 2018, 85% of these students who graduated from high school did not pass a 12th-grade reading assessment.

In 2025, 58.3% of Tennessee third-grade students did not pass their reading test, although there was some improvement from the previous year.

Globally, disruption to education during the COVID-19 pandemic caused a substantial learning deficit in reading abilities and other academic areas. This arose early in the pandemic response and persists over time, and is particularly large among children from low socio-economic backgrounds. In the US, several research studies show that, in the absence of additional support, there is nearly a 90 percent chance that a poor reader in Grade 1 will remain a poor reader. By 2026, children born during COVID-19 will be in kindergarten. According to one study, teachers reported that those students were not as strong in phonemic awareness as students had been five years earlier. Another report from the US says children born during the pandemic are showing a one-month decrease in reading results in grades 1 and 2, suggesting systemic issues.

In Canada, it was reported that, in the province of Ontario, 26% of grade three students and 51% of grade three students with special education needs (students with an Individual Education Plan) did not meet the provincial reading standards in 2025. The province of Nova Scotia reported that 26% of grade three students did not meet the provincial reading standards in 2025. The province of New Brunswick reported that 39.5% and 21.7% did not meet the Reading Comprehension Achievement Levels for Anglophone grades four and six, respectively, in 2025. The province of Newfoundland and Labrador reported that 44% of grade 3 students fell below the expected results in reading. In the province of Prince Edward Island 26% of Grade 3 students did not meet the expectations in reading comprehension.

The Progress in International Reading Literacy Study (PIRLS) publishes reading achievement for fourth graders in 50 countries. The five countries with the highest overall reading average are the Russian Federation, Singapore, Hong Kong SAR, Ireland and Finland. Some others are: England 10th, United States 15th, Australia 21st, Canada 23rd, and New Zealand 33rd.

=== Middle school to high school ===
Many older students lag behind in reading skills and are "hiding in plain sight". The RAND Corporation reported that 44% of teachers in grades 3-12 say their students always or almost always have difficulty reading the content in their class. Ninety-seven percent of teachers modify their teaching to accommodate this concern. According to teachers, some of the causes are: lack of motivation or interest in reading (28%), and students are not reading fluently or automatically enough (19%). Some US reports in 2025 found that fifty-eight percent of teachers said that twenty-five percent or more of their middle and high school students had difficulty with basic reading skills. Recent reports indicate that 10% of students are really struggling with single-syllable decoding, and at least 40% of middle schoolers are struggling with complex decoding.

Furthermore, middle school English/language arts teachers often lack training in foundational literacy skills. In addition, educators and researchers say there aren't as many resources designed to teach decoding skills to older students, and an EdWeek survey found that only a third of high school educators say their schools offer dedicated time for reading intervention.

This problem, in which middle school students and high school students are having difficulty comprehending grade-level text, may have its roots in what is referred to as the Decoding Threshold. Simply put, this means that some of these students lack sufficient foundational reading skills, which prevents them from correctly decoding words. Some researchers suggest that the solution is to use a screening test "to identify the students who need continued instructional support in foundational literacy skills". If warranted, the student may need to receive additional foundational reading skills training up to grade 8 or beyond. (Note: Sources:)

Between 2013 and 2024, 40 US States and the District of Columbia have passed laws or implemented new policies related to evidence-based reading instruction. In 2023, New York City set about to require schools to teach reading with an emphasis on phonics. In that city, less than half of the students from the third grade to the eighth grade of school scored as proficient on state reading exams. More than 63% of Black and Hispanic test-takers did not make the grade. In 2025 the reading scores improved. 56.3% of all students in the third to eighth grades were reading at the proficient level. Black and Hispanic students also experienced an improvement, with 47% and 43.5% respectively reading at the proficiency level.

In response to the need for resources for older struggling readers, many organizations have offered material support.

The Programme for International Student Assessment (PISA) measures 15-year-old school pupils' scholastic performance on mathematics, science, and reading. Critics, however, say PISA is fundamentally flawed in its underlying view of education, its implementation, and its interpretation and impact on education globally.

=== Adults ages 16 to 65 ===
The reading levels of adults, ages 16–65, in 39 countries are reported by the Programme for the International Assessment of Adult Competencies (PIAAC). Between 2011 and 2018, PIAAC reports the percentage of adults reading at-or-below level one (the lowest of five levels). Some examples are Japan 4.9%, Finland 10.6%, the Netherlands 11.7%, Australia 12.6%, Sweden 13.3%, Canada 16.4%, England (UK) 16.4%, and the United States 16.9%.

== By region ==
According to the World Bank, 53% of all children in low and middle-income countries suffer from 'learning poverty'. In 2019, using data from the UNESCO Institute for Statistics, they published a report entitled Ending Learning Poverty: What will it take. Learning poverty is defined as being unable to read and understand a simple text by age 10.

Although they say that all foundational skills are important, including reading, numeracy, basic reasoning ability, socio-emotional skills, and others, they focus specifically on reading. They reason that reading proficiency is an easily understood metric of learning, serves as a student's gateway to learning in every other area, and can act as a proxy for foundational learning in other subjects.

They suggest five pillars to reduce learning poverty:

1. Learners are prepared and motivated to learn
2. Teachers at all levels are effective and valued
3. Classrooms are equipped for learning
4. Schools are safe and inclusive spaces, and
5. Education systems are well-managed.

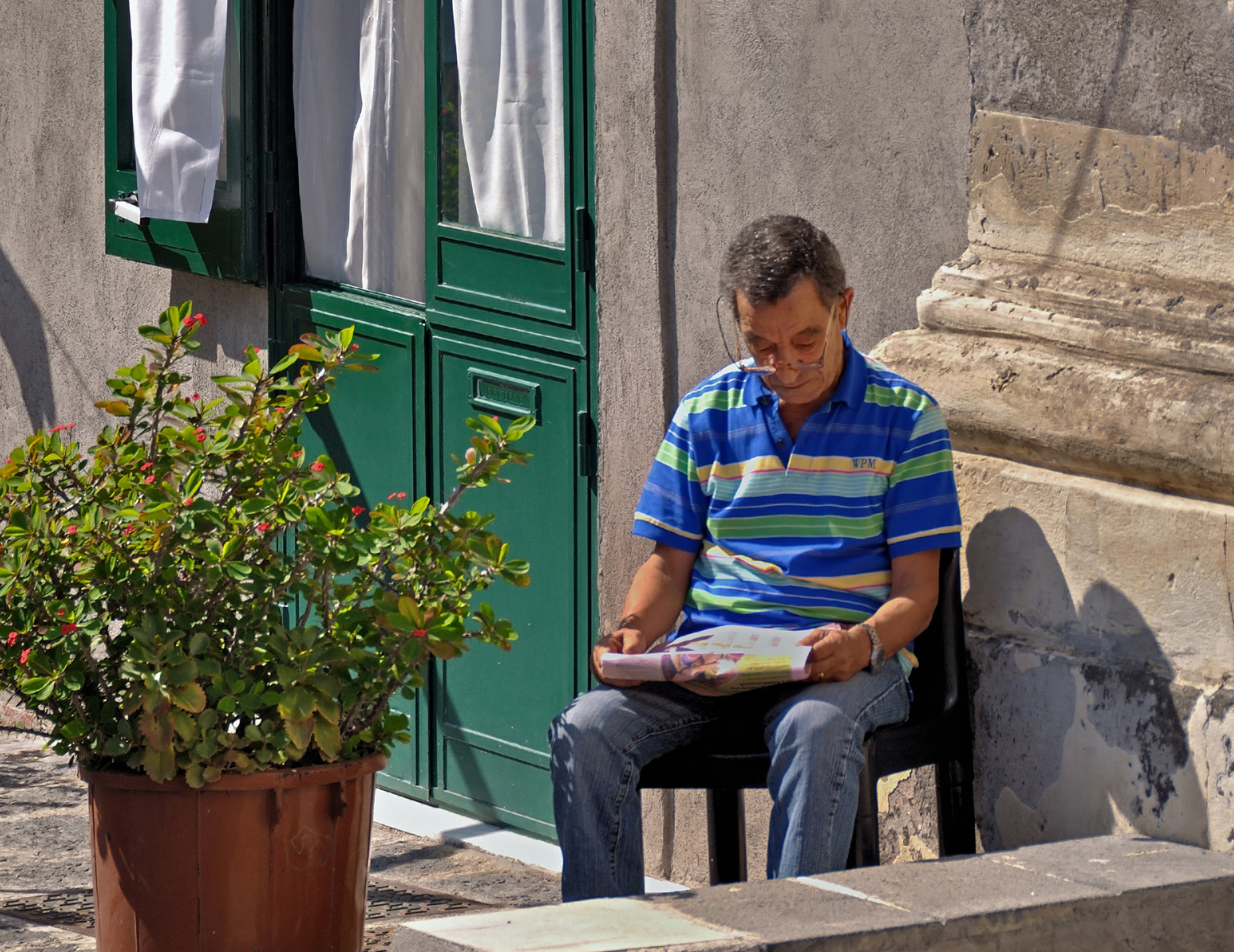
Reading a newspaper in Catania, Sicily.

== Reports ==
The following organizations measure and report on reading achievement in the United States and internationally:

=== NAEP - US grades 4 and 8 ===
In the United States, the National Assessment of Educational Progress or NAEP ("The Nation's Report Card") is the national assessment of what students know and can do in various subjects. Four of these subjects – reading, writing, mathematics, and science – are assessed most frequently and reported at the state and district level, usually for grades 4 and 8.

In 2024, concerning the reading skills of the nation's grade-four public school students, 31% performed at or above the NAEP Proficient level (solid academic performance), and 60% performed at or above the NAEP Basic level (partial mastery of the proficient level skills). In both instances, this represents a 2% decrease from 2022.

In 2013, 32% of grade-four students were reading below the basic level, whereas by 2024 this had increased to 40%. It is believed that students who read below the basic level do not have sufficient support to complete their schoolwork.

The only state that made statistically significant progress in grade-four reading since 2019 was Louisiana. This was attributed to the State having curriculum reviews since 2015, providing incentives for districts to use material that is evidence-based, together with professional training for teachers.

Reading scores for the individual States and Districts are available on the NAEP site. Between 2017 and 2019, Mississippi was the only State that had a grade-four reading score increase, and 17 States had a score decrease. This has been referred to as the Mississippi Miracle.

The COVID-19 pandemic had a significant impact on reading results in the United States. In 2022 the average basic-level reading score among elementary school children was 3 points lower compared to 2019 (the previous assessment year) and roughly equivalent to the first reading assessment in 1992. Students of all ethnic groups other than Asians saw their scores decline. However, "black, Hispanic, and American Indian/Alaska Native (AIAN) students and students in high-poverty schools were disproportionately impacted". (Other sources substantiated this). In 2022, no states had a reading score increase, and 30 states had a score decrease. The results by race or ethnicity were as follows:

Race / Ethnicity	2019 – Proficient level	2022 – Proficient level	2019 – Basic level	2022 – Basic level
Asian	57%	58%	82%	83%
Asian/Pacific Islander	55%	56%	81%	81%
White	45%	42%	77%	73%
Two or more races	40%	38%	72%	68%
National Average	35%	33%	65%	63%
Native Hawaiian/Other Pacific Islander	25%	23%	58%	50%
Hispanic	23%	21%	55%	50%
American Indian/Alaska Native	19%	18%	50%	43%
Black	18%	17%	48%	44%

NAEP reading assessment results are reported as average scores on a 0–500 scale. The Basic Level is 208 and the Proficient Level is 238. The average reading score for grade-four public school students was 219. Female students had an average score that was 7 points higher than male students. Students who were eligible for the National School Lunch Program (NSLP) had an average score that was 28 points lower than that for students who were not eligible.

=== PIAAC - adults, 16 to 65 ===
The Programme for the International Assessment of Adult Competencies (PIAAC) is an international study by the Organisation for Economic Co-operation and Development (OECD) of cognitive and workplace skills in 39 countries between 2011 and 2023. The Survey measures adults' proficiency in key information-processing skills – literacy, numeracy, and problem-solving. The focus is on the working-age population between the ages of 16 and 65. For example, the study shows the ranking of 38 countries as to the literacy proficiency among adults. According to the 2019 OECD report, the five countries with the highest ranking are Japan, Finland, the Netherlands, Sweden, and Australia; whereas Canada is 12th, England (UK) is 16th, and the United States is 19th. It is also worth noting that the PIAAC table A2.1 (2013) shows the percentage of adults reading at-or-below level one (out of five levels). Some examples are Japan 4.9%, Finland 10.6%, Netherlands 11.7%, Australia 12.6%, Sweden 13.3%, Canada 16.4%, England 16.4%, and the United States 16.9%.

=== Progress in International Reading Literacy Study ===
The Progress in International Reading Literacy Study (PIRLS) is an international study of reading (comprehension) achievement in fourth graders. It is designed to measure children's reading literacy achievement, to provide a baseline for future studies of trends in achievement, and to gather information about children's home and school experiences in learning to read. The 2021 PIRLS report shows the 4th-grade reading achievement by country in two categories (literary and informational). The ten countries with the highest overall reading average (with scores) are Singapore (587), Ireland (577), Hong Kong SAR (573), Russian Federation (567), Northern Ireland (566), England (UK) (558), Croatia (557), Lithuania (552), Finland (549), and Poland (549). Some others are the United States (548) 11th and Australia (548) 13th. Among the benchmarking participants are the four Canadian provinces of Alberta (539), British Columbia (535), Newfoundland and Labrador (523), and Quebec (551). The largest province, Ontario, was notably absent.

Rank	Country - 2021	Average scale score	Change over 5 years
1	Singapore	587	▲11 points
2	Ireland	577	▲10 points
3	Hong Kong	573	▲4 points
4	Russia	567	▼14 points
5	Northern Ireland	566	▲1 point
6	England (Note: Assessed one year later than originally scheduled)	558	▼1 point
7	Croatia	557	N/A
8	Lithuania	552	▲4 points
9	Finland	549	▼17 points
9	Poland	549	▼16 points
11	United States	548	▼1 point
12	Chinese Taipei	544	▼15 points
12	Sweden	544	▼11 points
14	Australia	540	▼4 points
14	Bulgaria	539	▼13 points
14	Czech Republic	539	▼4 points
17	Hungary	539	▼15 points
17	Denmark	539	▼8 points
17	Norway (Note: 5th grade students)	539	▼20 points
20	Italy	537	▼11 points
21	Macau	536	▼10 points
22	Austria	530	▼11 points
23	Slovakia	529	▼6 points
24	Latvia	528	▼30 points
25	Netherlands	527	▼18 points
26	Germany	524	▼13 points
27	New Zealand	521	▼2 points
27	Spain	521	▼7 points
29	Portugal	520	▼8 points
29	Slovenia	520	▼22 points
30	Malta	515	▲63 points
31	France	514	▲3 points
31	Serbia	514	N/A
33	Albania	513	N/A
34	Cyprus	511	N/A
34	Belgium (Flemish)	511	▼14 points
36	Israel	510	▼20 points
37	Kazakhstan	504	▼32 points
PIRLS Scale Centerpoint		500	Steady
38	Turkey	496	N/A
39	Belgium (French)	494	▼3 points
39	Georgia	494	▲6 points
41	Montenegro	487	N/A
42	Qatar	485	▲43 points
43	United Arab Emirates	483	▲33 points
44	Bahrain	458	▲12 points
45	Saudi Arabia	449	▲19 points
46	North Macedonia	442	N/A
47	Azerbaijan	440	▼32 points
48	Uzbekistan	437	N/A
49	Oman	429	▲11 points
50	Kosovo	421	N/A
51	Brazil	419	N/A
52	Iran	413	▼15 points
53	Jordan	381	N/A
54	Egypt	378	▲48 points
55	Morocco	372	▲14 points
56	South Africa	288	▼32 points
Benchmarking participants
–	Moscow (Russia)	598	▼14 points
–	(Emirate of Dubai) Dubai (United Arab Emirates)	552	▲37 points
–	Quebec (Canada)	551	▲4 points
–	Alberta (Canada)	539	N/A
–	British Columbia (Canada)	535	N/A
–	Newfoundland and Labrador (Canada)	523	N/A
–	(Emirate of Abu Dhabi) Abu Dhabi (United Arab Emirates)	440	▲26 points
–	South Africa (Note: 6th grade students)	384	N/A

Table key
Delayed assessment of 4th grade cohort at the beginning of 5th grade

==== PISA - 15-year-old school pupils ====
The Programme for International Student Assessment (PISA) measures 15-year-old school pupils scholastic performance on mathematics, science, and reading. In 2018, of the 79 participating countries/economies, on average, students in Beijing, Shanghai, Jiangsu and Zhejiang (China), and Singapore outperformed students from all other countries in reading, mathematics, and science. 21 countries have reading scores above the OECD average scores and many of the scores are not statistically different.

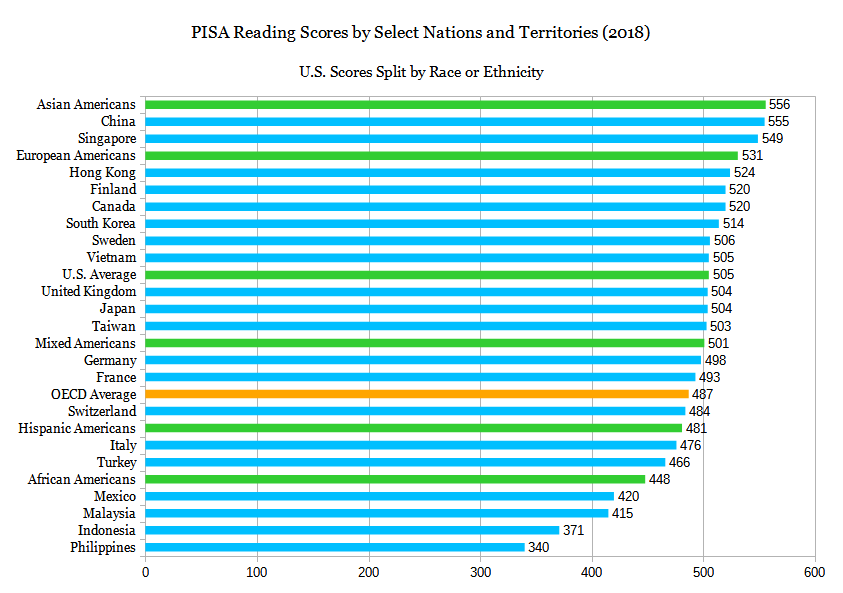

Critics, however, say PISA is fundamentally flawed in its underlying view of education, its implementation, and its interpretation and impact on education globally. In 2014, more than 100 academics from around the world called for a moratorium on PISA. According to a 2023 book, PISA is failing in its mission. It suggests that flatlined student outcomes and policy shortcomings have much to do with PISA's implicit ideological biases, structural impediments such as union advocacy, and conflicts of interest.

==== EQAO - Ontario, Canada, grade 3 ====
The Education Quality and Accountability Office, EQAO, is an agency of the government of Ontario, Canada that reports on the publicly funded school system. It reported the following results for children who met the provincial standard in reading.

Percentage of grade three students in Ontario's English language schools that met the provincial standard in reading

2018–2019	2021–2022	2022–2023	2023–2024
77	73	73	71

Percentage of grade three students with "special needs" in Ontario's English language schools that met the provincial standard in reading

2018–2019	2021–2022	2022–2023	2023–2024
53	48	47	45

== Reasons ==
As to why English reading levels are low, neuroscientist Mark Seidenberg suggests it may be the result of three factors:

1) the English language has a deep alphabetic orthography (i.e., some sounds have several spellings),

2) linguistic variability (language accents) that contributes to the "Black-White achievement gap" in the US, and

3) how reading is taught

With respect to #3, many researchers point to three areas:

- Contemporary reading science has had very little impact on educational practice—mainly because of a "two-cultures problem separating science and education".
- Current teaching practice rests on outdated assumptions that make learning to read harder than it needs to be.
- Connecting evidence-based practice to educational practice would be beneficial, but is extremely difficult to achieve due to a lack of adequate training in the science of reading among many teachers.
