= Mennonite Educational Institute =

Location
- 4081 Clearbrook Road; Abbotsford, British Columbia, V4X 2M8; Canada; 49°4′34.62″N 122°20′49.09″W

Information
- School type: Independent
- Motto: Equipping students for life and forever
- Religious affiliation: Mennonite
- Founded: 1944
- Head of Schools: Vijay Manuel
- Principals: Mark Thiessen (Secondary), Sean LaForest (Middle), Shawn Burkinshaw (Elementary)
- Vice Principals: Marc Bergen (Secondary), Sandra Fehr (Middle), Andrea Penner (Elementary)
- Grades: K-12
- Enrollment: 665 (Secondary), 398 (Middle), 469 (Elementary), (2006/7 figures)
- Language: English
- Area: Clearbrook, Abbotsford
- Colours: Blue and Gold
- Team name: Eagles
- Website: www.meischools.com

The Mennonite Educational Institute (MEI) is an independent country day school located in Abbotsford British Columbia, approximately 70 kilometres from Vancouver. MEI consists of four divisions — a preschool, elementary, middle, and secondary school — and is regularly ranked as one of the top schools in British Columbia. Founded in the first half of the 20th century as an independent high school by a group of churches belonging to the Mennonite community, the MEI schools now welcomes students from a wide range of religious, ethnic, and cultural backgrounds. While weekly chapel services are still held, students are welcome to come from any faith or background. MEI has a strong tradition of both academic, musical, and athletic performance with graduating students going on to attend top universities across Canada, the US, and the UK. The MEI Eagles, the school's official sporting teams, have competed in a wide range of national and international competitions.

== History ==
=== Beginnings ===
In May 1944, representatives of fourteen churches in British Columbia were invited to a meeting to discuss starting a Mennonite-focused high school. Support for this concept grew very slowly. Only seven churches were represented at the first meeting, and one of these was strongly opposed to the idea. However, at a second meeting on June 5, 1944, representatives from nine churches voiced their support; this group of supporters became the MEI Society churches. At this meeting, Mr. C. Toews, Mr. G. Sukkau and Mr. A. Bauman were elected to go to Victoria to present the plan to the provincial government.

The committee met with Dr. Samuel John Willis, British Columbia's long-serving Deputy Minister of Education, who pointed out the advantages of integration into the public Canadian school system for students of Mennonite origin. Eventually, however, he stated that the government had no objection to the establishment of an independent school, if three conditions were met: there would be no financial support from the government, qualified teachers must be hired, and the English language must be used. In addition, Grade 12 students would be required to write departmental examinations.

However, further obstacles surfaced. Due to wartime restrictions, no building permits could be obtained to erect a new building. On July 3, 1944, representatives from ten churches met to discuss this. It was decided to enlarge South Abbotsford Bible School, allowing Grades 9 and 10 to be offered in the fall. Mr. Isaak J. Dyck of Winkler, Manitoba was hired to teach at a salary of $1,500 per year. Mr. F.C. Thiessen taught as well, and served as principal for the first year.

A 26'x46' addition was hurriedly built onto the Bible School at a cost of $1,500. Churches which had pledged support were levied a $1 per member fee, thereby raising $2,300 to cover the costs of building and outfitting the school with desks, blackboards, and basic library and lab equipment. Student tuitions were set at $80.

Interest in MEI that first year exceeded expectations, with sixty students wishing to enroll. Since some Grade 11 students also wished to attend, a third teacher, Mr. H. Nikkel, was hired. However, the war intruded again, and several of the young men who had begun attending received their conscription notices and were forced to leave.

In order to help the fledgling school get on its feet, all three teachers accepted salaries at 50-70% of those paid in the local school district. The 44 remaining students generated only $3,520 of the $4,200 required for their salaries that year. Despite such a meager beginning, the project continued to move forward.

It was assumed right from the beginning that the Bible school annex was a temporary solution, and discussions about whether the school should be located in Abbotsford or Yarrow continued. Eventually, 2 acres (8,100 m^{2}) were purchased at the corner of Clearbrook and Old Yale Roads, and blueprints were drawn for a six-room school.

=== New Campus ===
It was decided that for 1946–47, South Abbotsford Bible School would move to property which had been purchased north of Clearbrook, on the present Columbia Bible College site, allowing the high school to expand into the entire Bible School building until the new facility was ready for occupancy.

The building period appears to have been very difficult. Some materials, such as kiln-dried lumber, could not be obtained due to war shortages, volunteer labour (which was needed to keep the costs down) was not always readily available, and money from churches to support the project was slow coming in. Several large bank loans were necessary and anxiety about the school's future ran high. However, despite setbacks and difficulties, the building was occupied in December 1946, and grew steadily over most of the next 34 years, both in physical size and in student enrollment.

=== Move to current site ===
In April 1973 several concerned businessmen in the community formed a new society called Friend of the MEI, with the goal of providing financial assistance to the school in order to expand its program offerings and to renovate or relocate the school building. For the first several years of operation, the Friend contributed exclusively to the school's operational budget. But discussions about moving the school to a new campus burgeoned, and in 1976, the Society resolved to begin actively searching for a possible new site. It was the vision and drive of the Friend of the MEI that provided the impetus for relocation to the present site at the corner of Clearbrook and Downes Road; the school moved in 1980. In keeping with the tradition of continual expansion, the new school building has already seen two additions: one at the east end in 1988, and another at the west end in 1992. These additions give the secondary school a total floor area of over 70,000 square feet (6,500 m^{2}).

=== Elementary school ===
MEI expanded its program offerings beyond the secondary grades for the first time in 1993, with the introduction of Kindergarten and Grade 1. A complete elementary school opened its doors in 1997 on the Abbotsford campus, the site of a former soccer field for the secondary school, and offered Kindergarten to Grade 7. By 2003, this school had 608 students enrolled.

=== Additional Campuses ===
MEI Chilliwack, established in July, 2001, helped the Society address one of their goals for the next ten years — to build a satellite campus in that area. The Chilliwack campus was founded in 1990 and operated under the authority of Valley Christian School. In 2001, the Parent Society of financially troubled VCS released the school so that it could become part of the MEI Society. MEI Chilliwack offered Kindergarten to Grade 9; students of high school age who wished to continue their education at MEI were compelled to travel to the main campus in Abbotsford. On July 1, 2010, the Chilliwack school became independent once again, under the name of Cascade Christian School.

=== Middle school ===
In 2003, construction began on a middle school on Downes Road, next to the secondary school building. In the fall of 2004, the doors to this latest addition were opened, reducing the number of students in the elementary school to 450 by limiting it to Grades K - 5.

The new middle school had 370 students enrolled, with space available for approximately another 100 students. This addition also meant that the portable classrooms could finally be removed. With the Grade 8 classes moved into the middle school, the secondary school's enrollment has been lowered to a more manageable 635 students.

== Independent school status and governance ==
MEI is classified as a Group 1 school under British Columbia's Independent School Act, and as such receives only 50% of the Abbotsford School District’s per student operating grant from the Ministry of Education. The school receives no government funding for capital costs. Governance is provided by a board of directors, consisting of 6 executive and 15 non-executive members elected by members of MEI's 12 supporting churches.

== Academics ==
MEI has maintained a tradition of academic rigor throughout its 60-year history, consistently ranking 78 of 529 secondary schools in BC for student performance on provincial exams. Students in Grades 4, 7 and 10 met public and private school average results in standardized Math & Academics Reading test and in 2012, MEI graduating students were recognized as a finalist in the Fraser Institute's recognition of Academic Excellence in the province. The school's stated commitment is "the assurance that all MEI graduates are qualified for admission into universities, colleges, technical, and Bible schools." Over 50% of MEI's students complete their year on the school's Honour Roll, which requires an average of 80% and higher, and more than two thirds of graduates move on to post-secondary institutions. The Fraser Institute's 2014 report card on school performance gave the secondary school 8.1 out of 10 and ranked it 30th out of 289 schools. When its elementary school is compared to other local public elementary schools it ranks 3 out of 8 when students with learning disabilities are factored out.

== Athletics ==
After adding basketball to its academic offerings in 1946, the school has attained excellence in a number of sports, hanging BC Provincial Championship Banners on the gym wall in basketball in 1963 and volleyball in 2013. Individual MEI athletes have, in the past, also won gold at the high school swimming, golf and track and field championships.

== Notable alumni ==
- Anita Bathe, journalist
- Brian Doerksen, musician
- Jacob Haggard, former lead singer of the pop-rock band Hedley and convicted sex offender
- James Lepp, golfer
- John Sawatsky, writer
- Cade Smith, pitcher for the Cleveland Guardians of Major League Baseball
- Steven Marshall, volleyball player
- Dan Murphy, sportscaster
