= Literacy in the United States =

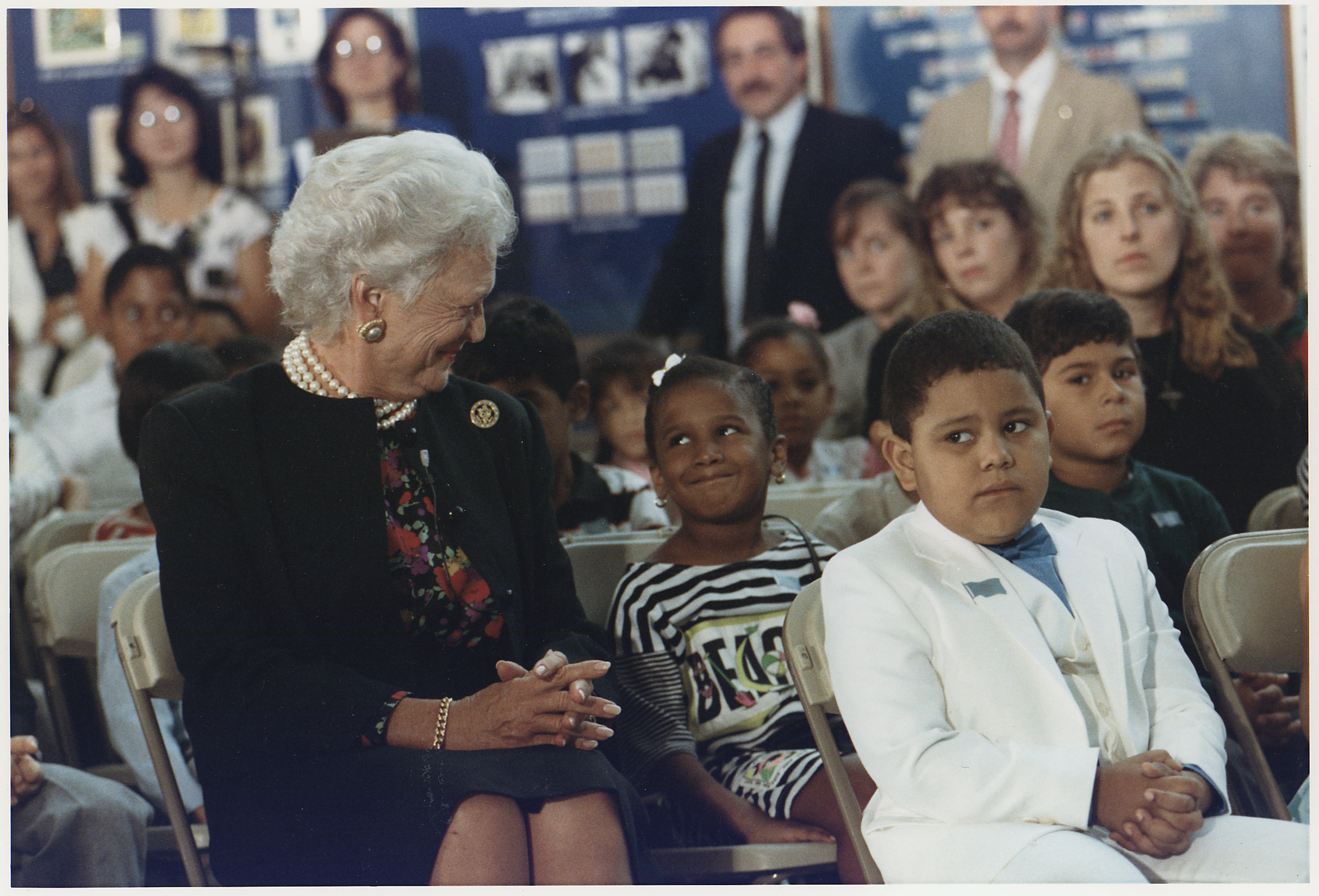
First Lady Barbara Bush with New York City school children at the UNESCO International Literacy Day celebration in 1989 (the same year that the Barbara Bush Foundation for Family Literacy was launched)

Adult literacy in the United States is assessed through national and international studies conducted by various government agencies and private research organizations. The most recent comprehensive data comes from a 2023 study conducted by the Department of Education's National Center for Education Statistics (NCES) as part of the OECD's Programme for the International Assessment of Adult Competencies.

In 2023, 28% of adults scored at or below Level 1, 29% at Level 2, and 44% at Level 3 or above. Adults scoring in the lowest levels of literacy increased 9 percentage points between 2017 and 2023. In 2017, 19% of U.S. adults achieved a Level 1 or below in literacy, while 48% scored at Level 3 or above.

Adults scoring at Level 3 or above are considered "proficient at working with information and ideas in texts" (see also § Definitions below). Adults scoring below Level 1 can comprehend simple sentences and short paragraphs with minimal structure but will struggle with multi-step instructions or complex sentences, while those at Level 1 can locate explicitly cued information in short texts, lists, or simple digital pages with minimal distractions but will struggle with multi-page texts and complex prose. In general, both groups struggle reading complex sentences, texts requiring multiple-step processing, and texts with distractions.

A 2020 analysis by Gallup in conjunction with the Barbara Bush Foundation for Family Literacy estimated that the U.S. economic output could increase by $2.2 trillion annually—approximately 10% of the national GDP—if all adults were at Level 3.

== History ==
=== Colonial era ===
Literacy in the colonial era was primarily defined as the ability to read, with writing considered a secondary skill. The significance of literacy varied according to region, social class, and occupation, but it played a fundamental role in religious practice, legal affairs, and the dissemination of political ideas.

Regional differences in literacy rates were pronounced. In New England, literacy was relatively high due to the Puritan emphasis on Bible reading. Colonial laws, such as the Massachusetts School Laws of the 1640s, mandated basic education, contributing to widespread literacy among the population. In the Middle Colonies, literacy rates were moderate, reflecting the region's religious and ethnic diversity. Education was often provided through private tutors, church-run schools, or apprenticeships. The Southern Colonies exhibited lower literacy rates, particularly among poorer whites and enslaved individuals. Enslaved people were denied access to education while poor whites were only able to attend school for which they could pay, since Southern state governments typically did not fund public schools.

Religious institutions were central to literacy education throughout the colonies. Churches frequently served as educational centers, with ministers and religious leaders promoting literacy to facilitate scripture reading. Educational materials commonly included the New England Primer, hornbooks, and the Bible.

Gender disparities in literacy were evident across the colonies. Men, particularly those in urban centers or from higher social classes, were more likely to be literate than women. In New England, some women acquired basic literacy through home instruction or religious communities. However, in the Middle and Southern Colonies, formal education for women was limited, and many remained illiterate.

Enslaved and Native American populations faced significant obstacles to literacy. In the Southern Colonies, laws were enacted to restrict the education of enslaved individuals, as literacy was perceived as a potential means of resistance. Nevertheless, some enslaved individuals acquired literacy, often in secret. Missionary efforts to educate Native American tribes occasionally included literacy instruction, although such efforts were typically tied to religious conversion rather than secular education.

Literacy played a critical role in colonial society, particularly in the dissemination of political ideas. Newspapers, pamphlets, and broadsides facilitated public discourse and contributed to the mobilization of support for independence during the American Revolution.

=== 19th century ===
19th century literacy rates in the United States were relatively high, despite the country's decentralized educational system. By 1875, the U.S. literacy rate was approximately 80 percent.

According to Lee Soltow and Edward Stevens, literacy was a foundational element in the development of American society, treating it as both a "collective good" and a critical socioeconomic indicator. In addition to seeing literacy as an individual skill, they emphasized its role in the broader transformation of society and economy. Their analysis focuses on several key dimensions of its importance. Literacy became a socioeconomic driver of rising economic and material conditions. They argue that literacy was essential for economic participation because literacy levels were intrinsically linked to occupation, wealth, and social standing. The spread of literacy increased the size of an informed citizenry capable of participating in an increasingly complex market economy. Soltow and Stevens argue the rapid rise of the "Common School" (the public school movement) in the North was a deliberate, state-government sponsored effort to standardize literacy. This led to shared values and a common language across a growing and diverse population. They say state government involvement in education was a direct response to the need for a more productive labor force during the 19th-century industrial expansion, especially in the Northeastern states.

Public schools were rare in the South before the late 19th century. Wealthy planters hired tutors for their children. Emphasizing the importance of Bible reading, many Protestant churches operated Sunday Schools that taught reading.

During the industrial revolution, many nursery schools, preschools and kindergartens were established and helped promote basic literacy.

==== Enslaved people and literacy ====
In the history of slavery in colonial America and later the United States, slave owners almost always made efforts to limit the education of enslaved people, including curtailing literacy. Lawmakers in slave states such as Alabama, Georgia, and Louisiana eventually established various anti-literacy laws that criminalized teaching or attempting to teach an enslaved person to read or write. States established these laws in part due to fears that increased literacy among enslaved people could lead to a slave rebellion. These laws are the only known instances of anti-literacy laws in history.

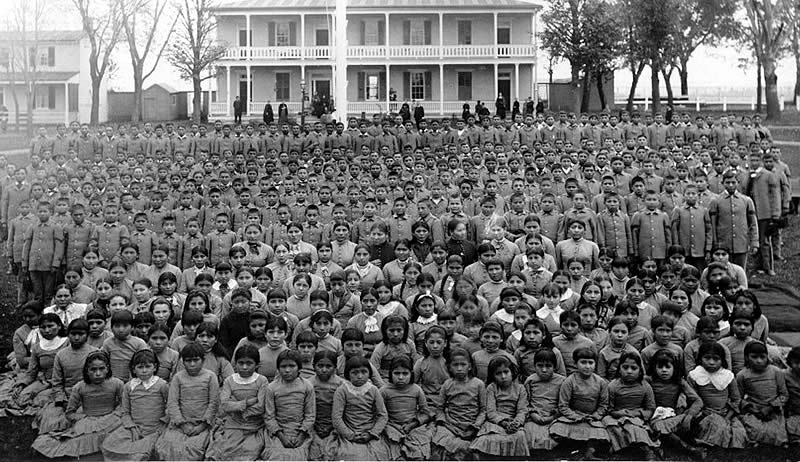
Native youth in front of Carlisle Indian Industrial School in Pennsylvania c.1900

=== 20th century ===
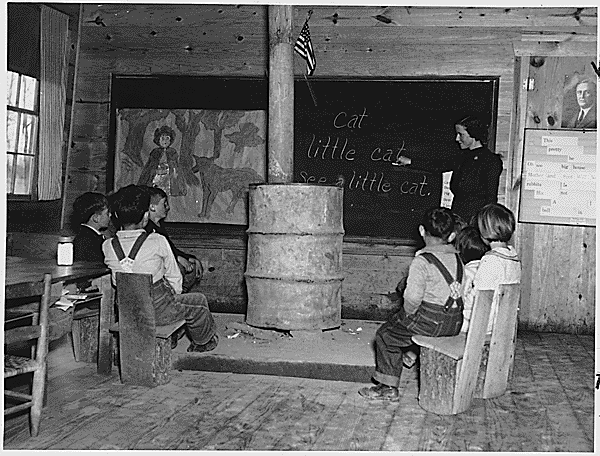
One-room school in Alabama c.1935

By 1900 44% of black people remained illiterate. There were significant improvements for African Americans and other races in the early 20th century; the descendants of former slaves up in the Reconstruction era and often had some chance to obtain a basic education. The gap in illiteracy between white and black adults continued to narrow through the 20th century, and in 1979, the rates were approximately equal.

There has been a notable increase in American citizens' educational attainment since then, but studies have also indicated a decline in reading performance which began during the 1970s. Although the U.S. Adult Education and Literacy System (AELS) and legislation such as the Economic Opportunity Act of 1964 had highlighted education as an issue of national importance, the push for high levels of mass literacy has been a recent development; expectations of literacy have sharply increased over past decades.

=== 21st century ===
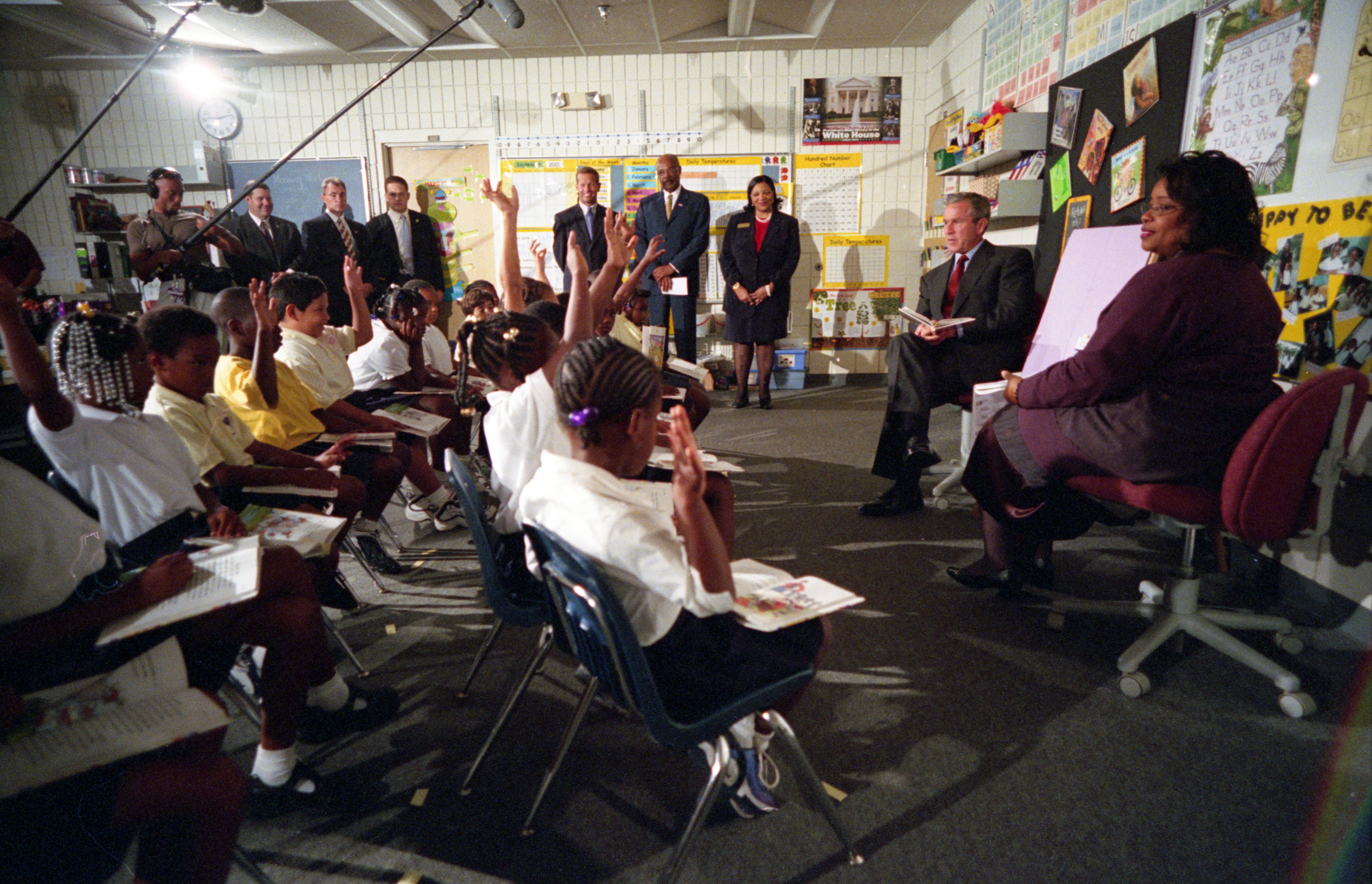
President George W. Bush participates in a reading demonstration the morning of Tuesday, September 11, 2001, at Emma E. Booker Elementary School in Sarasota, Fla.

Throughout the 20th century, there was an increase in federal acts and models to ensure that children continued to develop their literacy skills as a part of receiving a proper education. Starting in the 2000s, there has been an increase of immigrants in cities, the majority of whose children speak languages other than English and who thus fall behind their peers in reading. Elementary school literacy has been the focus of educational reform since that time.

With the landmark publication of A Nation at Risk by the US National Commission on Excellence in Education in 1983, concern for the performance of American students relative to other student bodies worldwide intensified. It has been observed that adolescents undergo a critical transition during their grade-school years which prepares them to learn and apply knowledge to their actions and behavior in the outside world. As the job market has become more demanding, the rigor of educational institutions has increased to prepare students for the more-complex tasks which will be expected of them. Addressing sub-par reading performance and low youth literacy rates is important to achieve high levels of mass literacy because the issue of sub-par academic performance is compounded. Students who struggle at an early age continue to struggle throughout their school years because they do not have the same foundation of understanding and breadth of knowledge to build upon as their peers; this often translates to below-average, poor literacy levels in later grades and into adulthood.

In 2019, the National Center for Educational Statistics reported that 4.1% of US adults had literacy abilities below level 1, defined as "unable to successfully determine the meaning of sentences, read relatively short texts to locate a single piece of information, or complete simple forms", and could be classified as functionally illiterate.

The COVID-19 pandemic necessitated school closures which had a negative impact on child literacy in America. More than one million eligible children did not enroll in kindergarten for the 2021–2022 school year in the U.S.

== Literacy rates ==
=== Definitions ===
The simplest definition of literacy in a nation is the percent of people age 15 or older who can read and write, which is used to rank nations. More complex definitions, involving the kind of reading needed for occupations or tasks in daily life, are termed functional literacy, prose literacy, document literacy and quantitative literacy. These more complex definitions of literacy are useful to educators, and are used by the Department of Education.

Functional literacy can be divided into useful literacy, informational literacy and pleasurable literacy. Useful literacy reflects the most-common practice of using an understanding of written text to navigate daily life. Informational literacy can be defined as text comprehension and the ability to connect new information presented in the text to previous knowledge. Pleasurable literacy is the ability of an individual to read, understand, and engage with texts that they enjoy. In a more abstract sense, multiple literacy can be classified into school, community, and personal concepts. These categories refer to an individual's ability to learn about academic subjects, understand social and cultural contexts, and learn about themselves from an examination of their own backgrounds.

In a 2003 study of adults, the NCES measured functional literacy. The center measured three types of functional literacy: prose literacy, document literacy, and quantitative literacy. Prose literacy consists of the "knowledge and skills needed to perform prose tasks", and includes the ability to read news articles and brochures. Document literacy consists of the "knowledge and skills needed to perform document tasks", which include job applications, payroll forms and maps. Similarly, quantitative literacy is the "knowledge and skills required to perform quantitative tasks"; those tasks include balancing a checkbook and filling out an order form.

The governments of other countries may label individuals who can read a few thousand simple words which they learned by sight in the first four grades in school as literate. UNESCO has collected the definitions used by nations in their tables of literacy in its General Metadata on National Literacy Data table; variations depend on whether childhood literacy (age six) or adult literacy was measured. The list distinguishes between a respondent's self-reported literacy and demonstrated ability to read.

Other sources may term individuals functionally illiterate if they are unable to read basic sources of written information, such as warning labels and driving directions. According to The World Factbook from the U.S. Central Intelligence Agency (CIA), "There are no universal definitions and standards of literacy" and its statistics are based on the most common definition: "the ability to read and write at a specified age." The National Center for Education Statistics defines literacy as "the ability to understand, evaluate, use and engage with written texts to participate in society, to achieve one's goals, and to develop one's knowledge and potential." "Detailing the standards that individual countries use to assess the ability to read and write is beyond the scope of the Factbook. Information on literacy, while not a perfect measure of educational results, is probably the most easily available and valid for international comparisons." The World Factbook does not include the U.S. literacy rate in its reporting. Using its definition, literacy refers to the percentage of people age 15 or older who can read and write.

=== Department of Education surveys ===
==== English Language Proficiency Survey (1982) ====
In 1982, funded by the Department of Education, the Census Bureau conducted the English Language Proficiency Survey (ELPS): an in-home literacy test of 3,400 adults. The Education Department considered this direct measure of literacy more accurate than a 1979 estimate which inferred literacy from the number of years of education completed. Data from the ELPS were presented in a 1986 Census Bureau report which concluded that 13% of adults living in the United States were illiterate in English. Nine percent of adults whose native language was English (native speakers) were illiterate, and 48 percent of non-native speakers were illiterate in English but not necessarily illiterate in their maternal language.

In his 1985 book, Illiterate America, Jonathan Kozol ascribed the very-high figures for literacy to weaknesses in methodology. Kozol noted that in addition to this weakness, the reliance on written forms would have excluded many individuals who did not have a literate family member to fill out the form for them. The Census Bureau reported a literacy rate of 86%, based on personal interviews and written responses to Census Bureau mailings. The bureau considered an individual literate if they said that they could read and write, and assumed that anyone with a fifth-grade education had at least an 80% chance of being literate. Kozol suggested that because illiterate people are likely to be unemployed and may not have a telephone or permanent address, the Census Bureau would have been unlikely to find them.

==== National Adult Literacy Survey (1992) ====
In 1988, Congress requested the Education Department conduct a national literacy survey. In 1992, the National Adult Literacy Survey was conducted by the NCES, administered by the Educational Testing Service and designed by Westat, to assess adult literacy in the United States. The survey categorized literacy into three domains: prose, document, and quantitative literacy, each measured on a 500-point scale and divided into five proficiency levels.

The study tested 26,000 in 12 states. Key findings indicate that 21–23% of U.S. adults had Level 1 literacy skills, meaning they struggled with basic reading comprehension, locating information, and making low-level inferences. Additionally, a significant proportion of those at this level were non-native English speakers, individuals with limited formal education, or older adults. Socioeconomic factors were closely tied to literacy levels, with those in lower literacy brackets more likely to live in poverty and earn lower wages.

==== National Assessment of Adult Literacy (2003) ====
The National Assessment of Adult Literacy was sponsored by the NCES as one of its assessment programs. The study included comparisons to the 1992 survey. Adults over sixteen years of age were scored on their prose, document, and quantitative literacy. Although there was no significant change in prose and document literacy between 1992 and 2003, quantitative literacy improved. The study maintained the practice of the 1992 National Adult Literacy Survey of dividing literacy into three aspects, each measured on a 500-point scale. Scores in each aspect were again grouped into five different levels, using a new numerical scale which differed for each aspect.

==== Report on the Condition of Education (2022) ====
Mandated by Congress, the annual Condition of Education Report is conducted by the NCES assesses national education data using 88 indicators and includes workforce statistics and global comparisons. The NCES operates under the aegis of the U.S. Department of Education as its statistical, with primary responsibility for the collection and analysis of education data.

=== National Assessment of Educational Progress ===
In the United States, the National Assessment of Educational Progress or NAEP ("The Nation's Report Card") is the national assessment of what students know and can do in various subjects. Four of these subjects—reading, writing, mathematics and science—are assessed most frequently and reported at the state and district level, usually for grades 4 and 8.

In 2019, with respect to the reading skills of the nation's grade-four public school students, 34% performed at or above the Proficient level (solid academic performance) and 65% performed at or above the Basic level (partial mastery of the proficient level skills). The results by race/ethnicity were as follows:

Race/Ethnicity	Proficient level	Basic level
Asian	57%	82%
White	44%	76%
Two or more races	40%	72%
National average	34%	65%
Native Hawaiian/Pacific Islander	24%	55%
Hispanic	23%	54%
American Indian/Alaska Native	20%	50%
Black	18%	47%

NAEP reading assessment results are reported as average scores on a 0–500 scale. The Basic Level is 208 and the Proficient Level is 238. The average reading score for grade-four public school students was 219. Female students had an average score that was 7 points higher than male students. Students who were eligible for the National School Lunch Program (NSLP) had an average score that was 28 points lower than that for students who were not eligible.

Reading scores for the individual states and districts are available on the NAEP site. Between 2017 and 2019 Mississippi was the only state that had a grade-four reading score increase and 17 states had a score decrease.

With these statistics all put together, these scores suggest that the reading proficiency in the U.S. remains inconsistent, with a large number of students performing below proficient levels.

The differences of the racial group scores also show uneven reading achievements, which is often associated with broader educational inequalities.

=== Other domestic studies ===
==== Central Connecticut State University study ====
From 2005 to 2009, Jack Miller of Central Connecticut State University conducted annual studies aimed at identifying America's most literate cities. Miller drew from a number of available data resources, and the CCSU America's Most Literate Cities study ranks the largest cities (population 250,000 and above) in the United States. The study focuses on six indicators of literacy: newspaper circulation, number of bookstores, library resources, periodical-publishing resources, educational attainment, and Internet resources.

City	Rankings				
City	2009	2008	2007	2006	2005
Seattle, WA	1	1.5	2	1	1
Washington, D.C.	2	3	5	3.5	3
Minneapolis, MN	3	1.5	1	2	2
Pittsburgh, PA	4	12	9	6	8
Atlanta, GA	5	6	8	3.5	4
Portland, OR	6	10.5	12	10	11
St. Paul, MN	7	4	3	5	9.5
Boston, MA	8	8	10	11	7
Cincinnati, OH	9	10.5	11	7	9.5
Denver, CO	10	7	4	8	6

=== International surveys ===
==== Adult Literacy and Life Skills Survey ====
The United States participated in the Adult Literacy and Life Skills Survey (ALL) with Bermuda, Canada, Italy, Norway, Switzerland, and the Mexican state of Nuevo León. Data was collected in 2003, and the results were published in 2005. Adults were scored on five levels of difficulty in prose, document and numeracy literacy. In 2003, only eight percent of the population aged 16 to 65 in Norway fell into the lowest skill level (level 1). The highest percentage was 47%, in Italy; the United States was third-highest at 20%.

==== Program for the International Assessment of Adult Competencies ====
The United States participated in the Programme for the International Assessment of Adult Competencies (PIAAC), which was "developed under the auspices" of the OECD. The PIAAC is a "collaborative endeavour involving the participating countries, the OECD Secretariat, the European Commission and an international consortium led by Educational Testing Service (ETS)". According to the NCES (NCES), the PIAAC provides the "most current indicator of the nation's progress in adult skills in literacy, numeracy, and problem-solving in technology-rich environments" and is a "large-scale assessment of adult skills."

In 2012, 24 countries participated in the large-scale study; thirty-three countries participated in 2014. The 2013 OECD report "First Results from the Survey of Adult Skills", which published the results of tests conducted in 2011 and 2012, said that the "skills of adults in the United States [had] remained relatively unchanged in the decade since the previous report, while other countries have been showing improvements, especially among adults with low basic skills." The 2011 literacy test was altered: "Before the PIAAC 2011 survey, however, essentially all that one could infer about the literacy skills of adults below Level 1 was that they could not consistently perform accurately on the easiest literacy tasks on the survey. One could not estimate what literacy tasks they could do successfully, if any."

In 2016, PIAAC 2012 and 2014 data were released. Participating adults in Singapore and the United States had the largest number of adults scoring "at or below Level 1 in literacy proficiency" compared to other participating countries in their performance in "all three reading components". According to the authors of the OECD report, "These results may be related to the language background of the immigrant population in the United States."

According to the 2012-2014 data, 79% of U.S. adults have "English literacy skills sufficient to complete tasks that require comparing and contrasting information, paraphrasing, or making low-level inferences." In this study, immigrants are over-represented in the low English literacy population. Adults born outside the U.S. make up 34% of adults with low literacy skills while making up only 15% of the population. However, of the adults with low English literacy skills, 66% were born in the U.S.

Gallup principal economist Jonathan Rothwell concluded, in a 2020 analysis and economic impact study of the PIAAC results collected during 2012 - 2017; commissioned by the Barbara Bush Foundation for Family Literacy, that the United States could increase its annual GDP by 10%, adding $2.2 trillion in annual income, by enabling greater literacy for the 54% of Americans reading below a sixth-grade level nationwide. The analysis noted that, of the 33 OECD nations included in the survey, the U.S. had placed sixteenth for literacy, and surmised that about half of Americans surveyed, aged 16 to 74, had demonstrated a below sixth-grade reading level.

== Literacy education in schools ==
=== Federal programs and bills ===
Federal government responses to address the problems of struggling English language learners and overstretched teachers ensued from the 1960s. Head Start was created in 1964 for children and families living under the poverty line, to help prepare children under five for elementary school and to provide family support for health, nutrition, and social services. In 1965, President Lyndon B. Johnson passed the Elementary and Secondary Education Act to ensure that each child gets equal education, regardless of their race or familial affluence. In response to English language learners, Congress passed the Bilingual Education Actin 1968. The act allowed ELL students to learn in their first language and provided resources to assist schools with ELL students. Generational discrimination connects directly to why students who struggle in reading proficiency who attend underfunded schools are typically children of color. Statistically, schools with BIPOC enrollment of 90% or more in its student body spend $733 less per student per year than schools with a White student body of 90% or more enrolled.

Teachers play an extremely important role in the classroom given that they work with the student consistently enough to notice which students struggle most. Studies have shown that teacher judgment assessments are an accurate determinant for elementary school students' reading proficiency. They are not as precise as the curriculum based measurements (CBM) but extremely accurate on average. This gives faster and more personal results in terms of identifying which student needs more assistance. In 1997, President Bill Clinton proposed that tutors work with children reading below their grade level. Tutoring programs include partnerships with university organizations in which college students tutor and develop the literacy skills of elementary school students. Using non-certified teachers reduces the amount of money that a school would have to put into hiring many certified teachers, which increases the number of children that can be helped. Many underprivileged elementary school students need this reading proficiency assistance but also deserve the best quality given the historical inequities within the educational system. The tutoring model's components can ensure that service from a non-certified tutor can in fact prove to be effective by "engaging reading materials that are carefully graded in difficulty"; offering "a sequenced word study or phonics curriculum"; "regularly scheduled tutoring sessions (at least two each week)"; "a committed group of non certified tutors (para-professionals or community volunteers)": and "a knowledgeable reading teacher who provides ongoing supervision to the tutors." Tutoring elementary school students is extremely effective when it is accompanied by a series of approved curriculum, adequate training, and systems of accountability.

By January 12, 2015, civil rights groups and education advocates drafted and released shared civil rights principles for the reauthorization of the Elementary and Secondary Education Act, which had been up for reauthorization since 2007. The reauthorization would ensure money for the education sector and push for equal access to educational opportunities for students across the country. 22 organizations had signed the principles by January 16. The following day, on January 17, senator Lamar Alexander released a draft reauthorization bill for ESEA.

Following ESEA approval, Title I schools received $6.4 billion in "Basic Grants," $1.3 billion in "Concentrated Grants," and $3.3 billion in "Targeted Grants" in 2015, in response to the Every Student Succeeds Act being passed. ESEA ensures financial assistance is provided to local educational agencies who work for children coming from low-income families in pursuit of help, and hence fulfill the goals of state academic standards. These Title I schools can contract private nonprofit tutoring programs to work with their students in enhancing skills such as reading comprehension, analytical skills, and word recognition.

The provisions through the No Child Left Behind Act adopted in 2002, the reauthorization of the ESEA in 2015, and the Every Student Succeeds Act (ESSA) in 2015 build upon specific guidelines, conditions, and financial policies, indicating progress towards equity in education. A study conducted in Alabama claimed that the addition of education standards and means of measuring whether school districts had met them raised awareness of a need for adequacy.

The American Rescue Plan Act of 2021 provided $122 billion in school funding for programs to assist with reopening amidst COVID-19 pandemic safety protocols and to address both academic and mental health needs of students. In July 2022, First Lady Jill Biden, a former teacher, and Education Secretary Miguel Cardona embarked on a two-day assessment tour to observe summer learning programs designed to help children catch up on reading, writing and arithmetic skills prior to the 2022–2023 school year.

=== Non-profit tutoring programs ===
Non-governmental organizations have been described as the "missing link between the government and the poor": NGOs bridge the gap that the government leaves open for the less fortunate. While Non-governmental Organizations (NGOs) in education were also not prevalent during the early 2000s, but with the declining standards of education, NGOs, which included both non-profits and for-profits emerged, which focused more on the "private engagement", the one-on-one teaching mode. "Private engagement [by tutoring programs] is not only altering the delivery of education but also participating in the reshaping of the politics of education" since the usage of material and mode of instruction does help mold the way a student views the world. Also, since the 1990s, and up until the early 21st century, there was a more significant concern regarding "the need for better articulation and specification of concepts," which were challenges that NGOs had to address. Though the work of NGOs in any field is to an extent independent of government intervention, however, there is some overlap and collaboration between them. NGOs within the education and literacy sectors are seen as supplemental to the already large governmental role in education. NGOs strengthen the overall reach that society can have on a child's education.

==== Reading Partners ====
Founded in 1999, Reading Partners in California operates in multiple states and is a nonprofit organization dedicated to improving literacy skills among elementary school students, particularly those in low-income communities. The organization primarily works with Title I public elementary schools, focusing on students who face significant educational barriers due to poverty. Reading Partners implements a structured curriculum aligned with Common Core State Standards to ensure consistency with national education benchmarks. The curriculum includes pre- and post-reading questions to develop critical thinking skills, mid-semester STAR assessments to reinforce vocabulary and comprehension, and the use of visual aids such as large-print texts and colorful illustrations to enhance engagement.

Research supports Reading Partners' tutoring model, which emphasizes individualized instruction in word recognition and reading comprehension. Studies have shown that combining these two elements leads to significant improvements in phonological decoding and overall literacy skills. One study found that students participating in the program for one year improved from the 15th percentile to the 21st percentile in reading ability.

== Adult literacy education ==
Literacy has particular importance in adulthood since the changing dynamics of the American job market demand greater skills and knowledge of entry-level workers. In the 2003 National Assessment of Adult Literacy, young adults without a post-secondary education experienced difficulty obtaining career positions. A multi-variable analysis indicated that low and below-basic literacy rates were characteristic of individuals without higher education, and improving and sustaining mass literacy at earlier stages of education has become a focus of American leaders and policymakers.

Adult and adolescent literacy levels are under greater scrutiny in the U.S., with a number of reports and studies published annually to monitor the nation's status. Initiatives to improve literacy rates have taken the form of government provisions and external funding, which have been driving forces behind national education reform from primary school to higher education.

At the college education level the reading and writing connection is often overlooked. The two are addressed in separate curriculums. However they are intertwined with each other. The curriculum in K-12 education focuses on the connection between reading and writing, but this focus shifts once students get to college. In college, students take courses focused on writing and the focus on reading is often overlooked. It is important to make sure both are still being focused on because just like technology evolves so does literacy. Students will become less equipped to be able to read closely and deeply when needed.

Writing practices can help students improve reading skills and comprehension, while reading can also help with writing skills. For example, reading activities are helpful for students developing comprehension skills. It encourages active participation and expands their ability to write because they become more familiar with how texts are written. Focusing on reading and writing skills simultaneously will help students engage with sources to make thoughtful statements which will enhance writing. Learning to read like a writer is key. When students learn to read like a writer, they focus on how the author constructs sentences, develops arguments, and builds narrative flow.

=== English-language learners and literacy ===
Literacy standards and tests also apply to non-English speaking populations in schools. Implemented in 2010, Common Core serves as the national education curriculum and standards by which most public schools must abide. It serves as the latest vision of literacy in America, including comprehension skills in writing and reading and methods to achieve annual standards. Common Core's aim is to improve and expand literacy for students by the end of their high school careers. Within this system there are principals to address English language learners (ELL), and their placement within classrooms of native English speakers. This area of curriculum is designed to offer an extra layer of support for ELL. The US Department of Education and National Center for Education Statistics have found discrepancies within Common Core's curriculum that do not fully address the needs of ELL populations. Educational gaps are created by inequality within classrooms, in this case, a separation between ELL and native English speakers are due in part by Common Core's lack of support.

ELL have remained "stuck" at an intermediate level of proficiency brought on by expectations and standardized testing that places them behind and distances them from their English-speaking peers. These expectations produce a cycle of needing to "catch up" or needing to be at the same level as other students without the extra accommodations. A study from 2011 concluded that 65% of Bay Area, eighth grade ELL students scored "Below Basic" on standardized writing assessments, with only 1% scoring at the "Proficient" level.

=== Public library outreach efforts ===
The public library has long been a force promoting literacy in many countries. In the US, the American Library Association promotes literacy through the Office for Literacy and Outreach Services. This committee is tasked with ensuring equitable access to information and advocating for adult new and non-readers.

The release of the National Assessment of Adult Literacy report in 2005 revealed that approximately 14% of US adults function at the lowest level of literacy and 29% at the basic functional literacy level and cannot help their children with homework beyond the first few grades. A lack of reading skills hinders adults from reaching their full potential—they might have difficulty getting and maintaining a job, providing for their families, or even reading a story to their children. For adults, the library might be the only source for a literacy program.

== See also ==
- Books in the United States
- History of education in the United States
- Learning to read
- Reading
- Writing education in the United States
