= Anita Bathe =

Canadian television journalist

Anita Bathe is a Canadian television journalist, best known as an anchor of CBC News Vancouver at Six on CBUT-DT in Vancouver, British Columbia from 2018 to 2024.

A native of Abbotsford, British Columbia, she is a graduate of MEI and the British Columbia Institute of Technology. She began her career as a community channel reporter for Shaw TV in the Vancouver area, later working for various commercial radio stations in the Vancouver and Victoria markets before joining the CBC as a reporter in 2016. She became coanchor with Mike Killeen of the 6 p.m. news in 2018, and continued as sole anchor of the program after Killeen retired in 2021.

In 2022, she won the Canadian Screen Award for Best Local News Anchor at the 10th Canadian Screen Awards.

In March 2025, after being away from the anchor desk on maternity leave, she announced her retirement from the CBC to take another job outside of journalism.

She is of South Asian background.

== Awards ==
2022 - Canadian Screen Awards - Best local news anchor
