= Education Quality and Accountability Office =

Crown agency in Ontario, Canada

Agency overview
- Formed: 1996
- Type: Crown agency
- Jurisdiction: Government of Ontario
- Headquarters: Toronto, Ontario, Canada
- Annual budget: $21.1 million (2021)
- Minister responsible: Todd Smith, Minister of Education
- Agency executive: Cameron Montgomery, Chair
- Website: eqao.com

The Education Quality and Accountability Office is a Crown agency of the Government of Ontario in Canada. It was legislated into creation in 1996 in response to recommendations made by the Royal Commission on Learning in February 1995.

EQAO is governed by a board of directors appointed by the Lieutenant Governor in Council. Cameron Montgomery has been the chair of the board since February 2019. EQAO has an annual budget of approximately $33 million CDN.

== Purpose ==
The stated purpose of EQAO tests is to ensure that there is accountability between school boards and schools in the publicly funded system in Ontario. Educational accountability is important to three key stakeholders: taxpayers, elected officials, and teachers. By providing yearly standardized tests, the Ministry of Education hopes to increase the quality of education in Ontario, while also using the tests to make plans for future improvement.

EQAO tests are intended to measure the student's ability to:

- Make sense of what they read in different kinds of texts
- Express their thoughts in writing using appropriate grammar, spelling and punctuation and
- Use appropriate math skills to solve problems

=== EQAO versus classroom tests ===
EQAO tests have different goals and intentions than normal classroom tests. These tests are not the same, but when considering the EQAO test results along with the classroom results, they can provide a picture of the students' overall learning.

Classroom tests:

- measure how well students have learned specific information;
- provide quick results teachers can use to modify teaching strategies;
- may have subjective components, based on the teacher's knowledge of each student, and
- provide results that may not be comparable across the school, board or province

EQAO tests:

- measure students' cumulative knowledge and skills in relation to a provincial standard;
- are given at key stages of students' education;
- are administered, scored and reported on in a consistent and objective manner and
- provide results that are comparable across the school, board, and province from year to year

== Mandate ==
EQAO's mandate is to conduct province-wide tests at key points in every student's primary, junior and secondary education and report the results to educators, parents and the public.

The specific responsibilities of the office include:

- developing tests for students in both the French- and English-language publicly funded school systems,
- overseeing the administration and marking of tests, in co-operation with school boards
- evaluating the quality and effectiveness of Ontario's education system
- managing Ontario's participation in national and international tests
- researching and collecting information on assessing academic achievement
- reporting to the public and to the Minister of Education and Training on the results of tests and generally on the quality and effectiveness of elementary and secondary school education and on the public accountability of boards
- making recommendations to the Government of Ontario on any matter related to the quality or effectiveness of elementary and secondary school education or to the public accountability of boards.

EQAO conducts province-wide tests annually. Students attending publicly funded elementary and secondary schools in Ontario are required to take the respective tests at their grade level:

- Grade 3 (literacy and math tested at the end of the primary division);
- Grade 6 (literacy and math tested at the end of the junior division);
- Grade 9 (math tested in the first year of secondary school) and
- Grade 10 (literacy tested as a graduation requirement, known as the Ontario Secondary School Literacy Test).

For students with special education needs, some accommodations that are consistent with regular classroom assessment practices are permitted on the provincial tests. Special provisions may also be permitted for English language learners. In extenuating circumstances, the principal may exempt a student from writing the test if they are unable to complete part or all of the test, even with the appropriate accommodations.

The question on EQAO's tests are developed by Ontario educators and linked directly to the learning expectations in The Ontario Curriculum.

== Use of test results ==
Educators use the results of Ontario's province-wide tests in combination with other important information, such as demographic information, to help improve student learning and achievement. According to a 2010 survey by EQAO, more than 95 per cent of elementary school principals and 80 per cent of grade three and six teachers use EQAO test results to identify areas of strength and areas for improvement in reading, writing and math programs. More than 95 per cent of principals also reported that they use the data to guide overall school improvement initiatives.

Ontario student achievement results have had mixed success and failure since the EQAO began. For example, in the five years preceding 2018, grade six student reading scores increased from 79 to 82 per cent of students meeting the provincial standard (up from an all-time low in 1999 of only 48 per cent). Similar improvements were seen for writing with the percentage of students meeting the provincial standard increasing from 78 to 80 per cent in the last five years (up from an all-time low in 1999 of only 48 per cent). However, over the same five years math scores degraded from 54 per cent of students achieving the provincial standard in 2013 to only 49 per cent in 2018. Previous EQAO math testing had a high score of 63 per cent in 2009. The dramatic 14 per cent decrease in math scores in only ten years has resulted in the province launching an entire new math curriculum for the 2019–2020 school year.

== Information for parents ==
EQAO tests are based on The Ontario Curriculum, which is the foundation for what is taught in classrooms every day. Therefore, students should not need to study or do extra preparation for the test. All of the information in the test will have been covered by the classroom teacher throughout the entire school year. The best way for parents to support their children in writing the test is simply to be supportive and a play an active role in their children's learning every day of the school year. This support includes being aware of what the students are learning, being in constant communication with the classroom teacher about the student's learning development and needs, and providing a welcoming environment at home where students are able to complete any homework or assignments they may have.

An additional way that parents can help students in preparing for the test is to visit the EQAO website in order to find links explaining the format and sample test items, a result guide that explains how to interpret the marks, as well as a parent bulletin regarding the test. The school boards also provide parents with information sessions regarding the tests, to ensure that the parents are fully aware of the purpose, format and implementation of the test.

== Challenges ==
One of the biggest challenges surrounding EQAO testing is the idea that the traditional paper-and-pencil test does not assess all aspects of student learning. While the test is able to assess students' reading and writing, it struggles to effectively assess performance-based skills such as being able to work effectively in a group, designing a project or model, and speaking clearly.

Another challenge associated with EQAO testing is that students' ability to do their best on the test may be affected by feelings of stress and test anxiety. Some students may feel pressured to do well, because of external pressures from the teacher and parents, or pressure from themselves to succeed, and therefore may struggle to complete the test in a way that truly demonstrates their knowledge and learning.

== Criticisms ==
The establishment of the EQAO, and in particular standardized testing in Ontario, has been criticized by a number of groups, including the Ontario Secondary School Teachers' Federation (OSSTF) and the Elementary Teachers' Federation of Ontario (ETFO). Since the beginning, EQAO has received extensive criticism, especially about areas such as validity of the test, timelines for the tests, uses of the data results, and security. The ETFO published a video on August 17, 2010, titled "Is EQAO Failing Our Children?". This video provides an outlook on EQAO from the teachers perspective, discussing how the test may be causing more damage to children than good. This video can be seen on YouTube here.

While technical reports are available on the agency's website, some have complained that the office publishes little technical information about its tests. An evaluation conducted for EQAO, published by it in 2013, and posted on the website mentions no aspects of reliability or validity other than inter-rater agreement, and inter-rater agreement is presented as evidence of validity rather than of reliability.

Some have also pointed out that EQAO's staff tends to be drawn from the provincial education establishment. For example, former chair Charles Pascal, is a former deputy minister of education. The office's impartiality has been questioned when it has issued test results that might be taken as reflecting well on the provincial government.

Another major area of criticism is focused on the monetary expenses used each year to conduct the EQAO tests. The annual report states that $33 million was used in 2009/2010, plus an additional $77 million spent by the Literacy and Numeracy Secretariat, in hopes to improve future test scores. Some critics believe that the money poured into these annual tests could be better spent on things such as smaller class sizes, new schools, new classrooms, additional technology in classrooms, additional educational assistants, and additional classroom materials.

Some critics believe that the teacher knows best about the students' learning, and that a standardized-test does not adequately assess the authentic learning that has gone on in the classroom throughout the year. Teachers are able to see the students everyday, track their learning progress, and provide the students with beneficial feedback to continue improving their work. EQAO tests on the other hand, approach learning from a structured and systematic perspective, forcing students to demonstrate their knowledge in a way very different from that which is typically done in the classroom. The test does not allow for the student to grow or learn from the process, due to the fact that feedback is prohibited throughout the time writing the test. The majority use of multiple-choice questions limits critical thinking, and restricts creativity in the students. In addition, the test provides only one form of assessment. Authentic assessment is that which provides students with multiple ways to demonstrate their learning (example, through writing, speaking, demonstration, and hands-on interactions). Other subjects such as science, business, visual arts, music and physical education are not being assessed in the test despite being part of the education system.

Another recognized flaw in the EQAO testing system is with regards to Ontario's French Immersion program, which is consistently growing in attendance and popularity. Studies have shown that students enrolled in early French Immersion programs demonstrate a lag in their English literacy skills in the grade three EQAO test. These lower scores cause undue stress and concern for parents, students and teachers of these students. It has been recommended that EQAO offers the opportunity for early immersion students to opt out of the grade three testing as the results do not accurately represent the students' abilities.

== See also ==
- Provincial Achievement Tests
- List of Canadian primary and secondary examinations
