= Provincial Achievement Tests =

Albertan school tests for Grade 6 and 9

- Type: Standarized provincial test
- Administrator: Alberta Education
- Duration: 6 hours
- Score range: 0%-100%
- Regions: Alberta
- Languages: English, French
- Annual number of test takers: PAT: ~50,000 grade 6 and another ~50,000 grade 9 Alberta Curriculum students

Provincial Achievement Tests are standardized tests administered to all Alberta students in grade 6 and 9. The test was also used by the Northwest Territories until 2023. The government of Alberta instituted the examinations through Alberta Education to attain greater accountability and ensure its students were well regarded when applying to tertiary institutions. Tests may be administered in English or French, typically in May and June. Alberta, out of all Canadian provinces has the most standardized testing procedure of any province.

Standardized testing is controversial in general, and Alberta is not an exception. The Alberta Teacher's Association is formally against standardized testing.

== History ==
In 1983, the ministry instated an "Achievement Testing Program" for grades 3, 6, and 9. These were different than Provincial Achievement Tests because they assessed only one core subject (such as English language arts, social studies, mathematics, and science) a year. The grade 3 program was later cancelled.

In 2017, Alberta Education doubled students' allowed writing time for all provincial standardized tests. This can go up to 4 hours for Grade 6 and 9 PATs.

== Purpose ==
The official purpose of standardized testing according to the Ministry of Education is:

- To determine if students are learning what they are expected to learn.
- To report to Albertans how well students have achieved provincial standards at given points in their schooling.
- To assist schools, authorities, and the province in monitoring and improving student learning.
- To ensure that province-wide standards of achievement are maintained.
- To report individual and group results.

== See also ==
- Alberta Diploma Exam
- List of Canadian primary and secondary examinations
