= List of Canadian primary and secondary examinations =

Canadian primary and secondary standardized examinations are examinations developed in Canada and taken by primary and secondary students in some provinces and territories in Canada.

The majority of the exams listed are developed provincially and are unique to each respective province and their related adjacent territories. This is as a result of education in Canada being in the jurisdiction of the provinces and territories. Such exams can be important factors in the determination of final grades and therefore also in scholarship decisions, college, and university admissions. However, policies of post-secondary institutions in Canada vary concerning whether the blended exam and class grade are used or simply the class grade are used for admission.

A unique situation of primary and secondary examinations is that of Canada's territories. The territories mostly elect to adopt the curriculum of their most closely related adjacent provinces. This includes adopting the related provinces examination policy. Yukon and the Northwest Territories primarily follows the British Columbia curriculum. Meanwhile, Nunavut primarily follows the Alberta curriculum. Therefore, exams in these territories are developed and adjudicated by the aforementioned adjacent province but are administered by the territorial educational ministry. The reason for the territories adopting the curriculum of provinces is because the provinces have both greater means to create the curriculum and populations to ensure the curriculums acceptance by tertiary institutions. The reason for the territories adopting the curriculum of those specific provinces is as a result of the historical geography of Canada. Yukon was formed prior to the existence of any current western Canadian province except British Columbia. Meanwhile, Alberta, the Northwest Territories, Nunavut and a handful of other provinces were created from the now nonexistent North-Western Territories which was.

== List of examinations ==
For the purposes of the list, the 'course grade' is defined as the grade assigned by the teacher during classroom instruction. 'Final grade' or 'blended grade' are defined as the combined examination and course grade.

=== National ===
- Pan-Canadian Assessment Program (PCAP)
- Programme for International Student Assessment (PISA)
- Programme for the International Assessment of Adult Competencies (PIAAC)
- International Computer and Information Literacy Study (ICILS)
- Teacher Education and Development Study in Mathematics (TEDS-M)
- Progress in International Reading Literacy Study (PIRLS)
- The Trends in International Mathematics and Science Study (TIMSS)
- International Baccalaureate
- Advanced Placement
- Canadian Achievement Test (CAT)

=== Alberta and Nunavut ===
Some universities choose to raise Albertan students marks because of their provincially required exams. For example, the University of British Columbia automatically raises Albertan students' averages by 2%.

- Provincial Achievement Tests (PAT) — Taken in grades 6 and 9. Exam mark is not included in final reported grade as class grades are not reported to the province.
- Alberta Diploma Exam (Diploma) — Taken in some 30 level (grade 12) courses, including:
  - Biology 30
  - Chemistry 30
  - Physics 30
  - Science 30
  - English Language Arts 30–1/30-2
  - Français 30–1
  - French Language Arts 30–1
  - Mathematics 30–1/30-2
  - Social Studies 30–1/30-2

Exam mark is worth 30% of final course grade.

=== British Columbia, Northwest Territories, and Yukon ===
- Graduation assessments — graduation literacy assessment (GLA) taken in grade 10 and 12. Graduation numeracy assessment (GNA) taken in grade 10. GLA and GNA are both marked on a scale of 4 (1 = Emerging, 2 = Developing, 3 = Proficient, 4 = Extending). There is no minimum score required to graduate (completion only).

Grade 7 SAT

Grade 4 and 7 FSA (British Columbia)

=== Manitoba ===
- Grade 3 Assessments, including the subjects reading, writing, and mathematics.
- Middle Years Assessments
  - Grade 7, including the subjects reading, writing, and mathematics.
  - Grade 8, including the subjects reading, writing, and mathematics.
- Grade 12 Provincial Tests — taken in some grade 12 level courses. Exam mark is worth 30% of final course grade except for Essential Mathematics test which is worth 20%.

=== Ontario ===
In Ontario, province wide assessment is administered by the crown corporation called the Education Quality and Accountability Office (EQAO). The EQAO administers tests in:

- Grade 3, including the subjects reading, writing, and mathematics.
- Grade 6, including the subjects reading, writing, and mathematics.
- Grade 9, which only includes a mathematics test.
- Grade 10, Ontario Secondary School Literacy Test is a graduation requirement. In order to satisfy the literacy requirement, students are required to attain a minimum score of 300 out of 400. Those who do not meet this threshold must either reattempt the test or enroll in the Ontario Literacy Course.

== Ontario Secondary School Department Exams: 2026–2027 ==
Beginning in the 2026–2027 school year, there is a greater emphasis on formal written examinations in Ontario secondary schools. Departments should prioritize written final exams over culminating activities, such as projects and presentations.

== Final Mark Breakdown ==
Grade	Classroom Work	Final Evaluation	Attendance and Participation
Grades 9 and 10	65%	20%	15%
Grades 11 and 12	65%	25%	10%

== Requirements for Department Exams ==
- Mandatory written examinations: English, Mathematics, Science, Geography, and History courses must include a formal written final examination, unless the course is part of a workplace-bound pathway.
- Written exams over culminating activities: Departments should prioritize formal written examinations rather than relying primarily on final projects, presentations, or other culminating activities.
- Workplace-bound pathways: These courses may have alternative final evaluations instead of a written examination.
- Department planning: Teachers should review their course assessment plans to ensure that final evaluations meet applicable Ministry of Education and school board requirements.

== Key Takeaway ==
The focus is shifting toward students demonstrating their learning through formal written examinations. Departments should plan accordingly, with written exams taking priority over culminating projects and other final activities. In Ontario, there will still be some variation between schools on what is on the department examination; however, within the departments, there must be consistency on what skills are being tested on these examinations.

=== Prince Edward Island ===
Provincial examinations are known as Provincial Assessments in Prince Edward Island. Examinations prior to the IMA is not included in grade submission.

- Primary Literacy Assessments (PLA) — taken in grade 3.
- Primary Mathematics Assessments (PMA) — taken in grade 3.
- French Immersion Elementary Mathematics Assessments (French Immersion EMA) — taken in grade 5.
- Elementary Literacy Assessments (ELA) — taken in grade 6.
- Elementary Mathematics Assessments (EMA) — taken in grade 6.
- Intermediate Mathematics Assessments (IMA) — taken in grade 9. Exam mark is worth 10% of final course grade.
- Secondary Mathematics Assessments (SMA) — taken in grade 11. Exam mark is worth 25% for Math 521A, Math 521B and Math 521M. Worth 20% for Math 512K.

=== Quebec ===
- Ministerial Examinations — taken in grade 10 and 11 level subjects. Exam mark is worth 50% of the final grade. However, the final grade cannot be lower than the ministerial exam mark. For instance, if a student earns a 70% in the course, but an 80% on the exam, their final grade will be an 80%.

=== Saskatchewan ===
- Departmental Examinations — taken only by students instructed by non-accredited teachers, for home-based education students, and for adults wishing to earn Level 30 credits. Exam mark is worth 40% of final grade.

=== New Brunswick ===
- Provincial Exams — only taken by students wishing to complete courses by correspondence or who do not attend a regular high school.

=== Newfoundland and Labrador ===
- Provincial Assessments — taken in grade 3 and grade 6.
- Public Examinations — taken in certain grade 12 level subjects. Exam is worth 40% of final grade.

=== Nova Scotia ===
- Nova Scotia Assessments — taken in grades 6 and 8 covering reading, writing, and mathematics.
- Nova Scotia Examinations — taken in grade 10 covering mathematics and English.
