= Alberta Diploma Exam =

Standardized test in Canada

Alberta Standarized Exams (Diploma and PAT)
- Type: Standarized Provincial Test
- Administrator: Alberta Education
- Year started: 1892
- Duration: 6 hours
- Score range: 0%-100%
- Regions: Alberta
- Languages: English, French
- Annual number of test takers: ~70,000 Alberta Curriculum dash-1 and dash-2 students

Alberta Diploma Exams are standardized tests taken by Alberta and Nunavut students in grade 12. The government instituted the examinations through Alberta Education to attain greater accountability and ensure its students were well regarded when applying to tertiary institutions. Tests may be administered in English or French. Alberta, out of all Canadian provinces has the most standardized testing procedure of any province.

The Diploma Examinations are taken by students enrolled in 30-1 and 30-2 level courses. Results of the diplomas are an important factor in admissions to universities and colleges across Canada as exam results make up 30% of the course grade for 30-level subjects.

Standardized testing is controversial in general, and Alberta is not an exception. The Alberta Teacher's Association is formally against standardized testing.

== History ==
=== Diploma Examinations ===
1892 was the first time that students in, what is today Alberta, took provincial exams. At the time, Alberta had not been created as a province yet and was part of the North-West Territories. These exams were taken in Standards V through VIII (grades 9 to 12). It is because of this shared history that today, the Northwest Territories and Nunavut both take some of the Alberta exams. In 1896, the exams were removed because teachers argued that students were being "monetized" because the school received $15 for each student who passed the exam. In 1905, exams were reinstated and were now worth 100% of the course mark. These exams were called "Public School Leaving Examinations". They were taken at the end of Standard V and if the student continued their education there were also taken at the end of Standards VI through VIII.

In 1912, "grades" replaced "standards" and soon after exams taken at the end of grades 10 and 11 were removed.

In 1972, exams were once again removed from the remaining grades and course work was worth 100% of the course mark. From 1976 onward, there was criticism that students were not being challenged and were not prepared for tertiary education. In 1983, the ministry responded to this criticism and final exams, now called "Diploma Exams", were reinstated and were now worth 50% of course mark. The remaining 50% of the course mark was determined by course work.

In October 2009, Alberta Education decided to eliminate the written response (Part A) for Biology 30, Chemistry 30, Pure Mathematics 30, Applied Mathematics 30, Physics 30, and Science 30. This saved the Alberta government 1.7 million dollars in producing the exams and paying teachers to mark them in Edmonton, the capital of Alberta. The written response (Part A) remains for Social Studies 30-1 and 30-2 as well as English 30-1 and 30-2. For humanities subjects, Part A written response will take place up to two weeks before Part B multiple choice. In 2010, eleven students were found to be cheating on the Pure Mathematics 30 exam as the exam had been leaked by a student who was writing the exam abroad and under the supervision of a relative. This prompted Alberta Education to amend its policies regarding administering diploma examinations abroad. In 2015, the ministry reduced the Diploma exams weighting to make up 30% of course mark for 2015/2016 school year. In 2017, Alberta Education doubled students' allowed writing time for all provincial standardized tests. This can go up to six hours for Grade 12 Diplomas. In September 2018, the written response component to mathematics exams was reinstated.

== Purpose ==
The official purpose of standardized testing according to the Ministry of Education is:

- To determine if students are learning what they are expected to learn.
- To report to Albertans how well students have achieved provincial standards at given points in their schooling.
- To assist schools, authorities, and the province in monitoring and improving student learning.
- To ensure that province-wide standards of achievement are maintained.
- To report individual and group results.

== Subjects ==
Grade twelve subjects for which there are diploma exams include:

Alberta Diploma Subjects
Subject	Written Component	Multiple Choice Component	Numeric Response Component
English Language Arts 30-1	✓	✓	
English Language Arts 30-2	✓	✓	
French Language Arts 30-1	✓	✓	
Français 30–1	✓	✓	
Social Studies 30-1	✓	✓	
Social Studies 30-2	✓	✓	
Mathematics 30-1	✓	✓	✓
Mathematics 30-2	✓	✓	✓
Biology 30		✓	✓
Physics 30		✓	✓
Chemistry 30		✓	✓
Science 30		✓	✓

== See also ==
- Provincial Achievement Tests
- List of Canadian primary and secondary examinations
