= Writing education in the United States =

Writing education in the United States at a national scale using methods other than direct teacher–student tutorial were first implemented in the 19th century. The positive association between students' development of the ability to use writing to refine and synthesize their thinking and their performance in other disciplines is well-documented.

A review of evidence-based practice studies emphasizes that instruction in writing should include: substantial and varied kinds of writing with supportive feedback, explicit teaching of skills and strategies, contemporary composing technologies, and opportunities to use writing as a means to develop knowledge of content. Another meta-analysis has confirmed that these benefits extend beyond English Language Arts classrooms and across the disciplines, finding evidence that science, social studies, and mathematics teachers who use writing-to-learn strategies can "reasonably expect" gains in "students' comprehension and application of content knowledge." Teachers' own professional preparation to teach writing, their personal beliefs about writing, and local and national policies regarding curriculum and instruction have been shown to influence how students learn and develop as writers.

== History ==
=== 19th century ===
The first composition studies department was founded by Harvard in the late 19th century, following the Civil War.

The process that lead to the creation of this department started some time earlier, in 1803, with Harvard's Boylston Professorship. The creation of the professorship was originally funded by Ward Nicholas Boylston in 1772, and the statute was drafted in 1803 by a committee including Eliphalet Pearson, who at the time held Harvard's position of Hancock Professorship of Hebrew and Other Oriental Languages. Up until the founding of the Boylston Professorship, English instruction had fallen under the Hancock Professorship. Historian and author, Samuel E. Morison, believes this is because at the time rhetoric and composition was seen as a branch of Homiletics. Pearson's statute defined the duties of the Boylston Professorship as teaching students "[the theory of writing and speaking well] in its most extended and comprehensive sense."

In 1869, Charles William Eliot was inaugurated as president of Harvard. During his inaugural speech he addressed what he believed to be a "neglect of the systematic study of the English language," specifically in regards to the American education system. Much of Eliot's work followed the ideas of Edward Tyrrel Channing, the Boylston Professor from 1819-1851, who during his term worked to expand Eliphalet Pearson's original statute by shifting emphasis from convention and grammar to broader concepts of individualism, expression, and self-improvement.

Through the 1870s, as enrollment in research universities increased and selection pressure grew, so did public concern about literacy, which universities like Harvard responded to. Eliot appointed Adams Sherman Hill, a former student of Channing, to the Harvard faculty in 1872 for purposes of improving English instruction at Harvard, soon after which modern composition was added as a subject to the curriculum. In 1874, Harvard established an entrance exam to test prospective students' written English, of which over half failed. Other institutions implemented their own exams, with similar results, further adding to the growing conversation in academia about the need for a standardized writing curriculum in secondary schools.

=== 20th century ===
After the establishment of Harvard's composition program, many universities around the US followed suit. The Modern Language Association(MLA) released reports in 1901, 1902, and 1903 compiled from surveys sent to instructors and institutions to document the progress of newly established composition programs. The reports include counts from Edward Everett Hale Jr. (University of Iowa), John Franklin Genung (Amherst College), and Fred Newton Scott (University of Michigan). Through these reports the MLA concluded that while composition gained popularity within the English rhetoric academic community, recognition from other academic fields and professionals remained minimal, and most if not all composition programs were lacking in faculty and resources.

It remained that early instruction of writing and composition was heavily focused on prescriptive ideas of language. Emphasis was placed on handwriting, grammar, punctuation and spelling, and papers were more likely to be graded on conformity to these conventions and accuracy of content than on style or creative expression of ideas. This focus on surface conventions can be traced back to the exceptional workload of US instructors during the end of the nineteenth century, who—since these conventions are easier to assess than quality of ideas—may have used it as a coping strategy to deal with the volume of themes they were expected to grade weekly.

Research conducted in the late 1970's by Donald Graves, Janet Emig, and others led to a focus on the process, rather than solely the product, of writing. The writing process approach rests on the premise that writing is a complex and individualized task which can be described through a series of recursive stages. These stages, hypothesized at the time to involve separate stages of pre-writing, writing, and rewriting (or revision) were modeled and taught to students, on the assumption that students' difficulties in each stage could be diagnosed more accurately. The National Writing Project was influential in spreading these ideas from higher education throughout all levels of schooling.

=== 21st century ===
Partially in response to the National Commission on Writing's challenge to American public educators "to teach all students to write effectively, clearly and thoughtfully," the National Governors Association Center for Best Practices (NGA Center) and the Council of Chief State School Officers (CCSSO) assumed in 2009 the coordination of a state-led effort called The Common Core State Standards Initiative. In this initiative, "Governors and state commissioners of education from 48 states, 2 territories and the District of Columbia committed to developing a common core of state standards in English-language arts." The Common Core State Standards Initiative's focus, with regard to writing, is to prepare America's students for college and career writing. Standards have been organized around the following categories: Text Types and Purposes; Production and Distribution of Writing; Research to Build and Present Knowledge; and Range of Writing. These main categories are divided into ten concepts and skills which are introduced to students in Kindergarten and then built upon in subsequent grade levels, with the intention that complexity and rigor increase each year to facilitate development and mastery.

== Methods ==
Lucille Schultz has documented a number of methods of teaching writing dating back to the mid-nineteenth century that drew on children's experience and expressive motivation. Self-efficacy has been described as an important factor in writing acquisition, fostered by supportive environments to avoid discomfort and discouragement, especially as writing instruction is often concurrent with the acquisition of new content. The role of teacher reassurance, concern, and concern for comfort, has been attested to be contribute to student motivation.

Like students, teachers need to feel supported and have motivation. Renae Mattson mentions that to ensure new learners understand the material being taught, there must be programs to build up teachers' overall confidence. In order to improve student writing, it is important that a teacher's knowledge of certain subjects be examined. In order for the new learners to comprehend what is being taught, there must be more programs in which teachers' confidence is developed. Just like new learners need support to feel comfortable, teachers do as well. Students can also choose to work together in a process known as collaborative writing.

=== Five-Paragraph Essay ===
The five-paragraph essay is a common strategy for teaching writing in primary and secondary school in the US. It is considered to be a standard format for academic papers to teach students the basics of presenting an argument and providing evidence.

=== Writing Across the Curriculum (WAC) ===
During the 1980's and 1990's, new approaches to teaching writing emerged, as teachers realized that in order to be effective, a piece of writing should be tailored to a specific purpose and audience. Prominent among these was the British-based movement which came to be known as writing across the curriculum. This approach rests on the premise that all teachers, not just language arts teachers, must be teachers of writing. Designed to ease the separation between literacy and content knowledge, this approach emphasizes the connection between writing and cognitive development, teaching students to write in a variety of genres, specific to purpose and discipline. Writing Across the Curriculum teachers often emphasize two basic pedagogical strands: Writing to Learn, informal writing done to prompt students to more deeply understand concepts; and Writing in the Disciplines, in which students are taught writing skills and conventions necessary to participate in specific academic discourse.

=== Writing for Understanding ===
Writing for understanding, a 21st-century approach, adapts the principles of backward design to teach students to write effectively. Writing for understanding grew out of a recognition that most students require explicit instruction in both the knowledge and the structures that they need to construct meaning in writing. Oral processing and the extensive use of models and modeling are core teaching methodologies in this approach. Writing for understanding rests on three pillars: backward design, understanding, and direct instruction. Students are given focused, intentional instruction and practice in:

- developing a knowledge and understanding which can be articulated in spoken and written language
- identifying an appropriate focus for thinking about and synthesizing that knowledge and understanding
- choosing a structure through which to clearly develop and present that knowledge and understanding
- establishing control over conventions.

Writing for understanding teachers design their instructions so students can generalize and transfer their skills to appropriate contexts. The Vermont Writing Collaborative serves as a clearinghouse for information about Writing for Understanding and provides professional development, instructional materials and support for educators.

=== Writing About Writing (WaW) ===
Writing about writing is a more advanced writing strategy that focuses on cultivating creativity and allowing flexibility in students to encourage confidence and garner understanding for writing as a field of its own. The approach was added as a revision to the first-year composition (FYC) curriculum in response to criticisms from scholars such as Charles Bazerman, Debra F. Dew, and Elizabeth Wardle. In 2010, Wardle and her research partner Doug Downs published the first edition of their textbook Writing About Writing, based on an earlier article of theirs published in 2007. Both the article and book sought to shift FYC instruction away from having students write primarily about other subjects while implementing writing skills, to instead framing writing itself as the subject.

=== The Reading and Apprenticeship Connections ===
According to some writing theorists, reading for pleasure provides a more effective way of mastering the art of writing than does a formal study of writing, language, grammar, and vocabulary.

"Studies that sought to improve writing by providing reading experiences in place of grammar study or additional writing practice found that these experiences were as beneficial as, or more beneficial than, grammar study or extra writing practice."

The apprenticeship approach provides one variant of the reading connection, arguing that the composition classroom should resemble pottery or piano workshops—minimizing dependence on excessive self-reflection, preoccupation with audience, and explicit rules. By watching the master, according to Michael Polanyi, an “apprentice unconsciously picks up the rules of the art, including those which are not explicitly known to the master himself.” Writing instructors, according to this approach, serve as models and coaches, providing explicit feedback in response to the learner's compositions. Students focus their attention on the task at hand, and not on "an inaccessible and confusing multitude of explicit rules and strategies."

== See also ==
- Education in the United States
- Four square writing method
- Literacy in the United States
