= Joan Abrahamson =

American attorney

- Education: Yale University (B.A.); Stanford University (M.A.); Harvard University (Ph.D.); University of California, Berkeley (J.D.)
- Occupation: President of the Jefferson Institute
- Known for: Previous positions as: Assistant Chief of Staff to Vice President George H. W. Bush; Special Assistant and Associate Counsel to Vice Presidents Walter Mondale and George Bush; Founding Chairman of the Barbara Bush Foundation for Family Literacy
- Notable work: 1985 MacArthur Fellows Program; 1980 White House Fellows

Joan Abrahamson (born in Los Angeles, California, United States) is an attorney, artist, former government appointee, and activist who is founder and president of the Jefferson Institute. She also worked in international security and economics, health, and the study of the creative process. Jonas Salk, a family friend, was a mentor to Abrahamson.

== Career ==
Prior to her founding the Jefferson Institute, Abrahamson was Assistant Chief of Staff to Vice President George H. W. Bush. As a White House Fellow, she served as Special Assistant and Associate Counsel to Vice Presidents Walter Mondale and George Bush. Prior to this, she worked for the United Nations Human Rights Commission in Geneva and for UNESCO’s Division of Human Rights and Peace in Paris. She planned and implemented the Vienna International Congress on the Teaching of Human Rights and the International Symposium on the Political Participation of Women. She served on the U.S. Commission of Fine Arts from 1990 to 1994.

From 1973 to 1976, Abrahamson redesigned the Fort Mason Pier Area in San Francisco, converting an army base for use as a community-based Fort Mason Center for Arts & Culture. Fort Mason has since been designated a model urban park by the National Park Service. She is currently involved with the transformation of the Presidio of San Francisco from an Army base to a National Park.

In 1985, she founded the Jefferson Institute, a non-partisan 501c3 think tank and public policy institute. The institute seeks to identify innovative private-sector approaches to remedy government policy issues, which it then works to implement, with emphasis on the future of cities.

== Boards of Directors ==
She became the founding chair of the Barbara Bush Foundation for Family Literacy in 1989, then president of the Jonas Salk Foundation in 1995. Abrahamson was appointed by President George W. Bush to serve on the U.S. Commission of Fine Arts in Washington, D.C., on February 22, 1990 for a four-year term. She also serves on the boards of: the National Geographic Society, the American Architectural Foundation, the California Institute of the Arts, and UNICEF, among others.

She has been a consultant to many organizations, including the Harvard University Center for Urban Affairs, the Rockefeller Commission on the Arts and Education in America, the National Endowment for the Arts, the United Nations University, the Executive Office of the President, and the Salk Institute for Biological Studies.

== Education ==
Abrahamson earned a B.A. from Yale in 1972, M.A. from Stanford in 1977, a doctorate in Learning Environments from Harvard and a J.D. from the Berkeley in 1980. She also served as a law clerk for the Supreme Court of California. In June 1985, Abrahamson was named a MacArthur Prize Fellow.

== Awards ==
- 1985 MacArthur Fellows Program
- 1980 White House Fellows
