= Barbara Bush Foundation for Family Literacy =

US non-profit organization

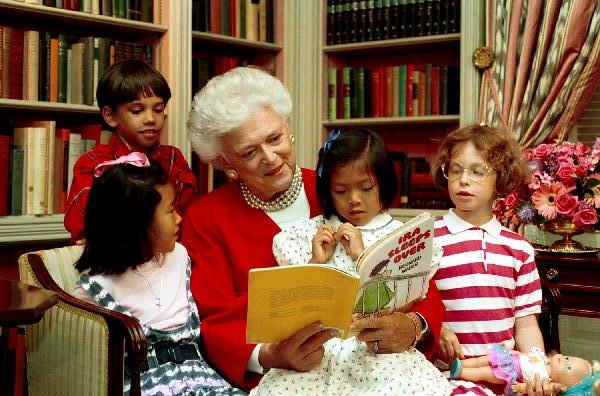
- First Lady Barbara Bush reading to children in the White House Library, July 1990
- Formation: 1989; 37 years ago
- Founder: Barbara Bush; First Lady of the United States (1989–1993)
- Legal status: 501(c)(3) organization
- Purpose: Literacy
- Key people: Barbara Bush (1989–2018); Doro Bush Koch (Honorary Chair) since 2014
- Website: www.barbarabush.org

The Barbara Bush Foundation for Family Literacy is a non-profit organization, headquartered in Washington D.C., supporting literacy as fundamental to the success of both families and the U.S. economy. The foundation promotes access to resources to build a stronger, more equitable America through literacy. The organization co-sponsored the Adult Literacy XPRIZE and produces a "Gap Map" literacy data mapping tool, the National Celebration of Reading, and other events.

== History ==
During Barbara Bush's time as second lady, while her husband was Vice President of the United States, she took an interest in literacy issues. She had previously coached her son, Neil, in reading, who was later diagnosed with dyslexia, and believed in family-based approaches to reverse illiteracy trends. Barbara Bush was also inspired by a literacy conference in November 1988, organized by her chief of staff, Susan Porter Rose. The conference hosted Loretta Lynn and other notable people, and after the night was over, Barbara Bush, wanted to create a foundation that would "break the intergenerational cycle of illiteracy." She subsequently began working with several different literacy organizations and spent much time researching and learning about the factors that contributed to illiteracy—she believed homelessness was also connected to illiteracy. In 1984 she wrote a children's book about her family told from the point of view of her dog C. Fred entitled C. Fred's Story, and donated all proceeds to literacy charities.

When her husband became president her most public cause was family literacy. She called it "the most important issue we have". Six weeks after her husband's inauguration, on March 6, 1989, she announced the establishment of the Barbara Bush Foundation for Family Literacy, during a White House luncheon. She appeared on the Oprah Winfrey Show to discuss the situation and spoke regularly on Mrs. Bush's Story Time, a national radio program that stressed the importance of reading aloud to children; some of the program's content is also included in the foundation's podcast by the same name, launched in 2020 and hosted by BBF honorary chair Doro Bush Koch. Her work to promote literacy inspired her husband to sign the 1991 National Literacy Act into law.

Barbara Bush became involved with literacy organizations, served on literacy committees and chaired reading organizations, and helped develop the Barbara Bush Foundation for Family Literacy. Some funding came from a book, credited to the Bushes' dog Millie but ghostwritten by Barbara Bush, Millie's Book: As Dictated to Barbara Bush. The book reached #1 on The New York Times bestseller nonfiction list, earning $1.1 Million of royalties to July 1991. All of the after-tax royalties were donated to the foundation.

When the Bush Family left the White House in 1993, she continued her work of family literacy. By its 30th anniversary, the Barbara Bush Foundation for Family Literacy had been described by CNN as "the nation's leading advocate for family literacy for more than three decades", which had helped raise over $110 million for new and existing literacy programs.

== Mission and management ==
The foundation's mission is "building a stronger, more equitable America through literacy." It is registered as a public charitable organization under Section 501(c)(3) of the Internal Revenue Code. The founding chair was Joan Abrahamson, and Barbara Bush served as honorary chairperson until 2012. From then, her children Jeb Bush and Doro Bush Koch served as co-chairs. Jeb Bush resigned in 2015, leaving Bush Koch as the honorary chairperson; Barbara Bush also remained active in the foundation.

Andrew Roberts serves as the foundation's president starting in 2024. Prior to stepping into the role of President, he served as the Barbara Bush Foundation's Chief Operating Officer for more than three years. In 2023, Roberts was honored as a Top 100 Chief Operating Officer by the OnCon Icon Awards. Before joining the Barbara Bush Foundation, Roberts held a number of leadership roles at AARP, including Vice President of Enterprise Strategy and Director of Organizational Effectiveness. In these positions, he helped develop a Malcolm Baldrige award-winning best practice strategic planning process for the organization's social impact portfolio. Previously, Roberts was a management consultant at a number of firms devoted to helping clients in the commercial, nonprofit and federal sectors with strategy and operations projects.

== Activities ==
Since 1994, the foundation has produced "National Celebration of Reading" events. As of 2014, the foundation ran 1500 literacy programs spread across the United States. In 2021, during its National Summit on Adult Literacy gala at Kennedy Center, the foundation announced its "National Action Plan for Adult Literacy", and First Lady Jill Biden paid tribute to founder Barbara Bush, stating that her work for literacy would "change lives for decades to come."

With support from the Dollar General Literacy Foundation, the Barbara Bush Foundation Adult Literacy XPRIZE was held during 2015 to 2019. The $7 million prize purse challenged teams to develop working mobile apps within one year that result in the greatest increase to adult learner literacy skills.

In 2016, the organization announced a new partnership with Talk With Me Baby, a Georgia-based organization that the Foundation helped launch nationwide. The partnership was announced at a The White House Summit on Behavioral Science Insights, along with the development of an online toolkit. The Foundation aimed for the toolkit to be used by any care providers, from parents to nurses to teachers, to engage children and work with them in the first three years of their lives to develop language, literacy and social skills.

In February 2017, the Foundation announced the creation of Voices for Literacy. Four other organizations joined the Foundation with a commitment to improve the lives of both children and adults through literacy. The other organizations—the Coalition on Adult Basic Education, Digital Promise, Pi Beta Phi, and Reading Is Fundamental—have varied backgrounds and areas of expertise, allowing Voices for Literacy to reach and connect with many different groups. The groups began their efforts with the "Leave Your Mark for Literacy" campaign, which involved an interactive online map tool. In 2019, the Foundation hosted a National Summit on Adult Literacy during its National Celebration of Reading event.

The Foundation funded a 2020 economic impact study by Gallup in which its principal economist, Jonathan Rothwell, concluded that the U.S. could increase its gross domestic product by 10%, generating an additional $2.2 trillion in annual income, by enabling greater literacy for the 54% of Americans reading below a sixth-grade level nationwide. The Barbara Bush Foundation for Family Literacy also released its "Gap Map" data tool in 2020 to illustrate the intersectionality of literacy with American health, income and education. CEO Robinson informed the Associated Press that the Gap Map furnishes "critical information on low literacy’s intersection with some of the most pressing issues faced by their citizens" to state and local leaders, as well as educators and philanthropists.
