= Ministry of Education (Alberta) =

Alberta Education
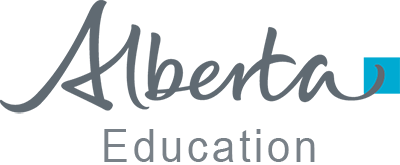
- Logo of Alberta Education

Agency overview
- Formed: September 1, 1905
- Minister responsible: Demetrios Nicolaides, Minister of Education (Alberta)
- Website: www.alberta.ca/ministry-education.aspx

Alberta Education (also known as the Ministry of Education) is the Albertan ministry responsible for early childhood education, primary education, and secondary education in Alberta. This is one of the original portfolios in the Government of Alberta: the first Minister of Education was part of the original cabinet in 1905, and that title existed continuously until 1999. The ministry was briefly merged with Alberta Advanced Education to form Alberta Learning from 1999 to 2004, but was recreated under its original name in 2004.

== Intra-ministerial organization ==
The Minister of Education is appointed by the Premier of Alberta. The Ministry is then divided into three organizations: the Alberta School Foundation Fund, the Department of Education, and the school jurisdictions of Alberta, which operate in an arms-length fashion to the ministry.

=== Alberta School Foundation Fund ===
The Alberta School Foundation Fund receives tax revenues from municipalities based on the equalized assessment of real property in Alberta and education mill rates established by the lieutenant governor in council. These monies, for which the ministry is responsible, along with those from provincial general revenues, are allocated on a fair and equitable basis to public and separate school boards for educational costs.

=== Department of Education ===
The Department of Education mandate is "[to provide a] foundation of knowledge, skills and competencies needed to prepare Alberta children and youth for lifelong success." The department is then further subdivided into five organizational units

- The Program and System Support Division which provides strategic leadership to support school authorities in their implementation of ministry programs and policies.
- The Student Learning Standards Division which provides strategic leadership in establishing provincial standards and guidelines for the design, development and supports for the implementation of curriculum for all subjects and grades
- The Strategic Services and Governance Division which provides leadership and corporate support focused on policy, legislation, corporate and operational planning and reporting, and also manages contracts, risks and records.
- The First Nations, Métis and Inuit Education Division which provides direction and leadership for these groups education in Alberta.
- The System Excellence Division which provides strategic leadership to enhance excellence in teaching and leadership in the education system, and supports the advancement of the ministry's workforce.
