= Ontario Secondary School Literacy Test =

Compulsory literacy exit exam in Ontario

The Ontario Secondary School Literacy Test (OSSLT; French: test provincial de compétences linguistiques or TPCL) is a compulsory standardized test for secondary school students in Ontario who wish to obtain the Ontario Secondary School Diploma. For students who entered Grade 9 in 1999–2000, successful completion of the test was not a graduation requirement. However, for those students who took the field test of the OSSLT in 2000–2001, failed the test, and chose to retake the OSSLT in October 2001, successful completion of the provincial literacy graduation requirement became a diploma requirement. It is administered by the Education Quality and Accountability Office (EQAO).

The OSSLT is written every year in either October-December or March-May. Before 2021, the OSSLT was previously written in either March or April. The first booklet includes multiple-choice and short answer questions, as well as a question asking the student to compose a newspaper article based on the headline and picture provided. The second booklet also includes multiple-choice and short answer questions, as well as a question asking the student to write an opinion piece on a given topic (series of paragraphs). The test is out of 400 marks.

== Reading component ==
Students are asked to read a variety of selections and answer questions about each of them. The questions asked are designed to measure students' understanding of ideas and information that are directly or indirectly stated in the text. Students are also expected to make personal connections related to the reading selections.

The selections used in the OSSLT consist of common reading materials, including information materials (e.g. instructions, newspaper articles), graphic materials (e.g. graphs, diagrams, legends) and literary materials (e.g. stories).

== Writing component ==
Students have to produce four pieces of writing for the OSSLT. The writing component is designed to measure the student's ability to develop a main idea, provide supporting details, organize and link ideas and information, use a tone for the particular type of writing and use correct spelling and grammar. Examples of pieces requested in the OSSLT include summaries, opinion pieces, news reports and information paragraphs. Marks may be deducted due to a lack of detail. However, the inclusion of too much information can also result in penalties.

== Preparation ==
Preparation for the test ranges from "Literacy Monday" activities in Grade 10 classes every Monday from the start of the school year. Some schools offer part-time after-school practice courses to entire semester-long courses that occupy a whole "period" each school day (OSSLC), although this is only targeted at struggling students or students who have failed in the past.

Reports have circulated by disgruntled parents that their teen who attends the local secondary school was never informed of the OSSLT's existence and thus was never prepared for the tests. This problem is mostly limited to underperforming schools mostly in inner city areas.

== Procedure ==
Before the OSSLT is written, teachers are expected to assist students in preparation for the test.

Upon completion of the test, booklets are shipped for marking. Those who fail must attempt the test the following year or take the Ontario Secondary School Literacy Course (OLC 4O) in grade 12 to meet the literacy requirement.

== Alternatives ==
=== Ontario Secondary School Literacy Course ===
The Ontario Secondary School Literacy Course (OSSLC, Course Code: OLC3O/OLC4O) is a Grade 11 or 12 open course that can be taken by those who had written the OSSLT more than once. It is designed to assist students in acquiring the basic literacy skills required for getting an Ontario high school diploma.

In the course, students will have to read a variety of texts (e.g. narrative text) and produce different types of writing (e.g. news reports). Accommodations can be made for students with an IEP (Individual Education Plan) so as to strengthen those students' language skills.

The OCLC can serve as one of at least four first language credits necessary for graduating high school, as well as a replacement for the OSSLT.

=== Adjudication process ===
Adjudication panels may be established at the end of the school year by school boards to provide certain students with an additional opportunity to meet the Ontario literacy requirement. Those who qualify for adjudication include students who were unable to write the OSSLT and/or enroll in or complete the OSSLC due to unforeseen circumstances, as well as students who have an IEP documenting required accommodations but, because of unforeseen circumstances, did not have access to these accommodations when taking the OSSLT.

== See also ==
- Education in Ontario
