= International Association for the Evaluation of Educational Achievement =

Nonprofit organization in Netherlands

The International Association for the Evaluation of Educational Achievement (IEA)
- Logo
- Secretariat: Amsterdam, Netherlands

Government
  - IEA Chair: Christian Christrup Kjeldsen
  - Executive Director: Dirk Hastedt
  - Director of IEA Amsterdam: Andrea Netten
  - Director of IEA Hamburg: Juliane Hencke
  - Financial Director, IEA: Jan-Peter Broek
- Establishment: 1958
- Website www.iea.nl

The International Association for the Evaluation of Educational Achievement (IEA) is an independent, international cooperative of national research institutions and governmental research agencies. It conducts large-scale comparative studies of educational achievement and other aspects of education.

Since its founding in 1958, IEA has conducted more than 30 research studies of cross-national achievement. IEA studies focus on subjects relating to mathematics, science, reading, civic and citizenship education, computer and information literacy, and teacher education, among others.

The IEA is responsible for the Trends in International Mathematics and Science Study (TIMSS), Progress in International Reading Literacy Study (PIRLS), International Civic and Citizenship Education Study (ICCS) and International Computer and Information Literacy Study (ICILS).

== History ==
Even though the IEA became a legal entity in 1967, its origins date back to 1958 when a group of scholars, educational psychologists, sociologists, and psychometricians met at the UNESCO Institute for Education in Hamburg, Germany, to discuss problems of school and student evaluation. They believed that an effective evaluation requires examination of both educational inputs as well as its outcomes (such as knowledge, attitudes, and participation). The founders assumed that if research could obtain evidence from across a wide range of systems, the variability would be sufficient to reveal important relationships within different school systems. They say they strongly rejected data-free assertions about the relative merits of various education systems, and aim to identify factors that would have meaningful and consistent influence on educational outcomes.

== Location ==
IEA Amsterdam The IEA headquarters is located in Amsterdam, the Netherlands.

IEA Hamburg The IEA's data processing and research department is located in Hamburg, Germany.
