= International Computer and Information Literacy Study =

International Grade 8 ICT literacy assessment

The International Computer and Information Literacy Study (ICILS) assesses information and communications technology (I.C.T.) knowledge of students and teachers worldwide. This test was created by the International Association for the Evaluation of Educational Achievement (IEA) in June 2010. There have been three cycles of the study: ICILS 2013, ICILS 2018, and ICILS 2023.

The first survey was conducted in 2013 and the results were released 3 March 2015. The test assessed computer and literacy skills of 60,000 8th grade students (average 13.5 years old) from 21 education systems worldwide. 18 of the 21 tested education systems had in place policies concerning the use of ICT in education.

The second cycle of the study was conducted in 2018, the results of which were released on 5 November 2019.

The third cycle of the study, ICILS 2023 was officially launched at the 2018 IEA General Assembly Meeting.

== Assessment ==
The study was assessed through 4 levels:

1. Knowledge of basic software
2. Basic use of computers as information source
3. Sufficient knowledge and skills of ICT for information gathering and use
4. Critical thinking while searching for information online

== Results ==
=== 2013 cycle ===
ICILS 2013 found that only 2% of students use their critical thinking and teachers lack confidence in teaching essential ICT skills.

83% of the student population achieved Level 1 status, while 2% of the population achieved Level 4 status. The study found that students use computers 87% of the time at home, more than they do in school, 54% of the time. ICILS has shown that in school, students use 45% of their time to prepare essays, 44% to prepare presentations, 40% working with other students at the same school, 39% completing school exercises and 30% organizing time and work. At home, students use 75% of their time communicating with others using messaging or social network, 52% searching for information for study or school work, 49% posting comments to online profiles or blogs and 48% using voice chat.

Fewer than half the teachers felt that they were capable of carrying out more complex tasks, such as installing software, collaborating with others and taking part in discussion forums.

=== 2018 cycle ===
The results of ICILS 2018 were released on 5 November 2019.

=== 2023 cycle ===
The results of ICILS 2023 were released on 12 November 2024.

== Participating education systems ==
=== ICILS 2013 ===
- Buenos Aires, Argentina
- Australia
- Chile
- Croatia
- Czech Republic
- Denmark
- Germany
- Hong Kong
- Lithuania
- Netherlands
- Norway (grade 9 only)
- Newfoundland and Labrador and Ontario, Canada
- Poland
- (Russia) Russian Federation
- (Slovakia) Slovak Republic
- Slovenia
- South Korea
- Switzerland
- Thailand
- Turkey

=== ICILS 2018 ===
- Chile
- Denmark
- Finland
- France
- Germany
- Italy
- Kazakhstan
- South Korea
- Luxembourg
- Portugal
- Moscow, Russia
- Uruguay
- United States

=== ICILS 2023 ===
- Austria
- Azerbaijan
- Belgium, Flemish
- Bosnia and Herzegovina
- Chile
- Chinese Taipei
- Croatia
- Cyprus
- Czech Republic
- Denmark
- Finland
- France
- Germany
- Germany (North Rhine-Westphalia)
- Greece
- Hungary
- Italy
- Kazakhstan
- Kosovo
- Latvia
- Luxembourg
- Malta
- Netherlands
- Norway (grade 9 only)
- Oman
- Portugal
- Romania
- Serbia
- (Slovakia) Slovak Republic
- Slovenia
- South Korea
- Spain
- Sweden
- United States
- Uruguay
