= Trends in International Mathematics and Science Study =

Study of international math and science skills

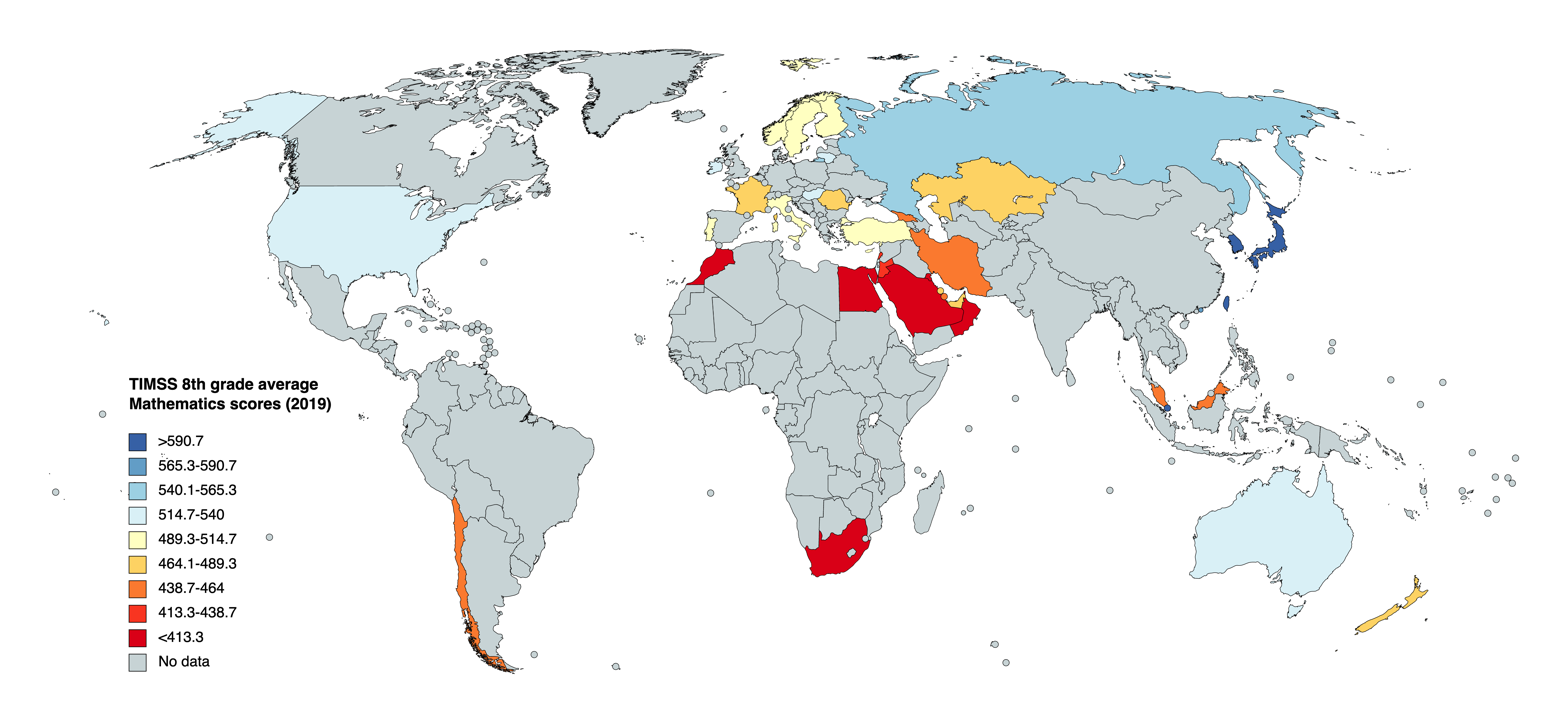
TIMSS 8th grade average Mathematics scores (2019)

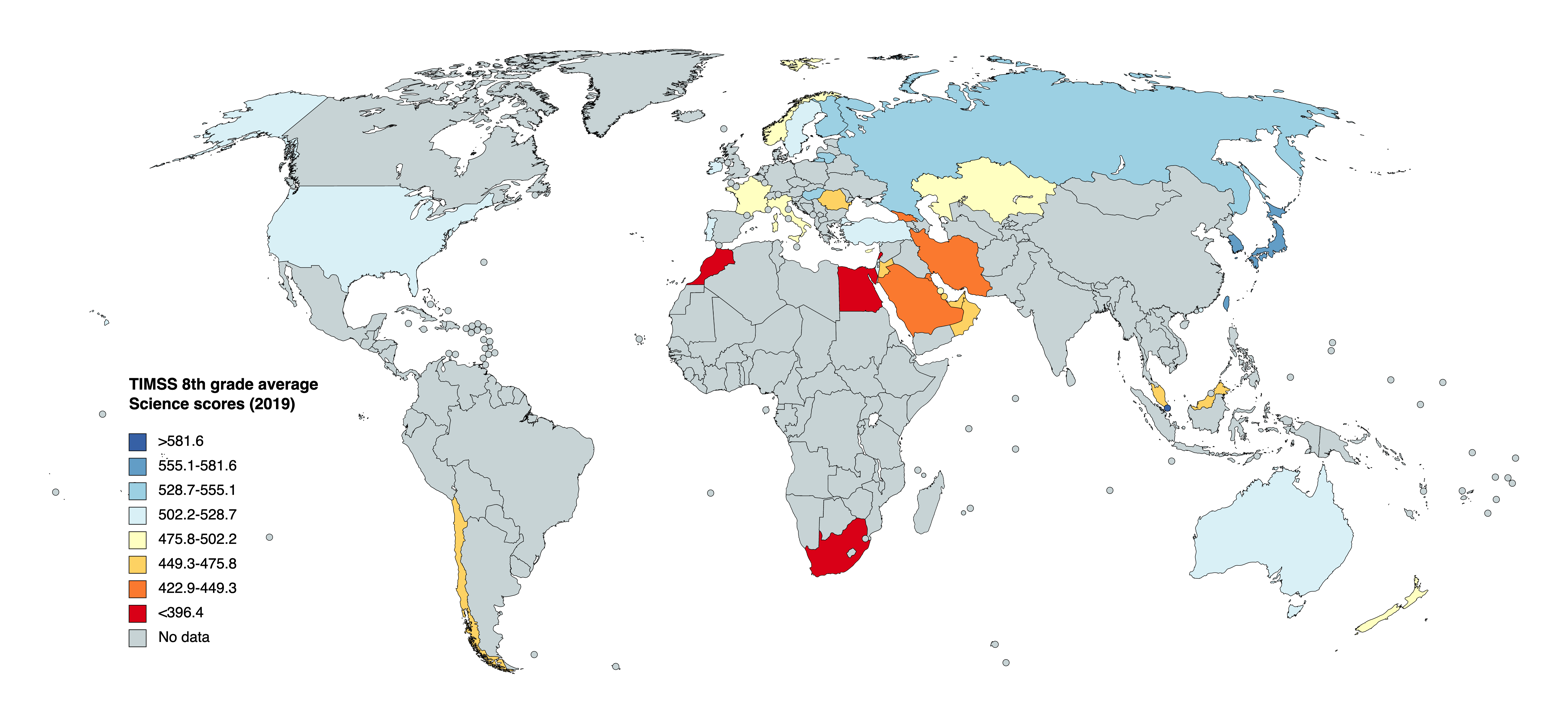
TIMSS 8th grade average Science scores (2019)

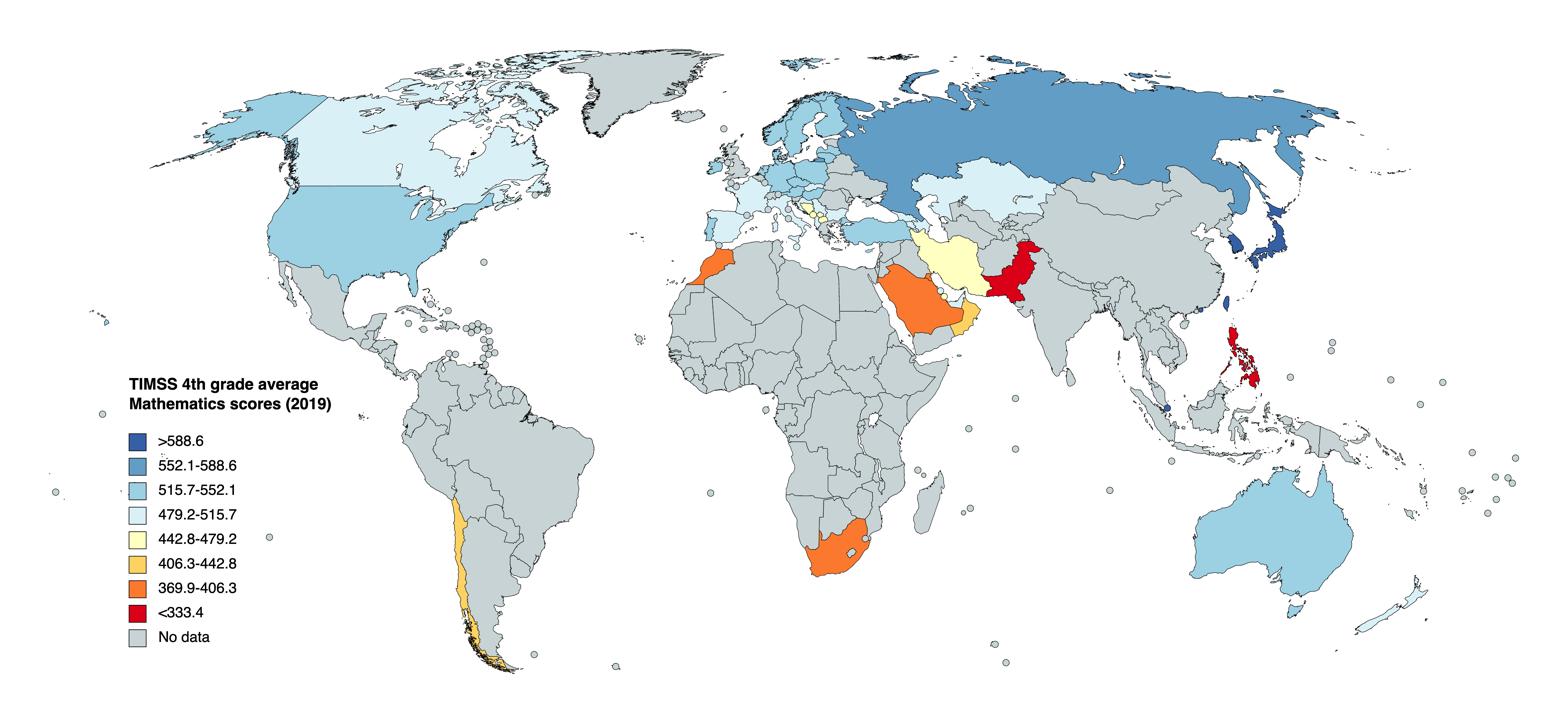
TIMSS 4th grade average Mathematics scores (2019)

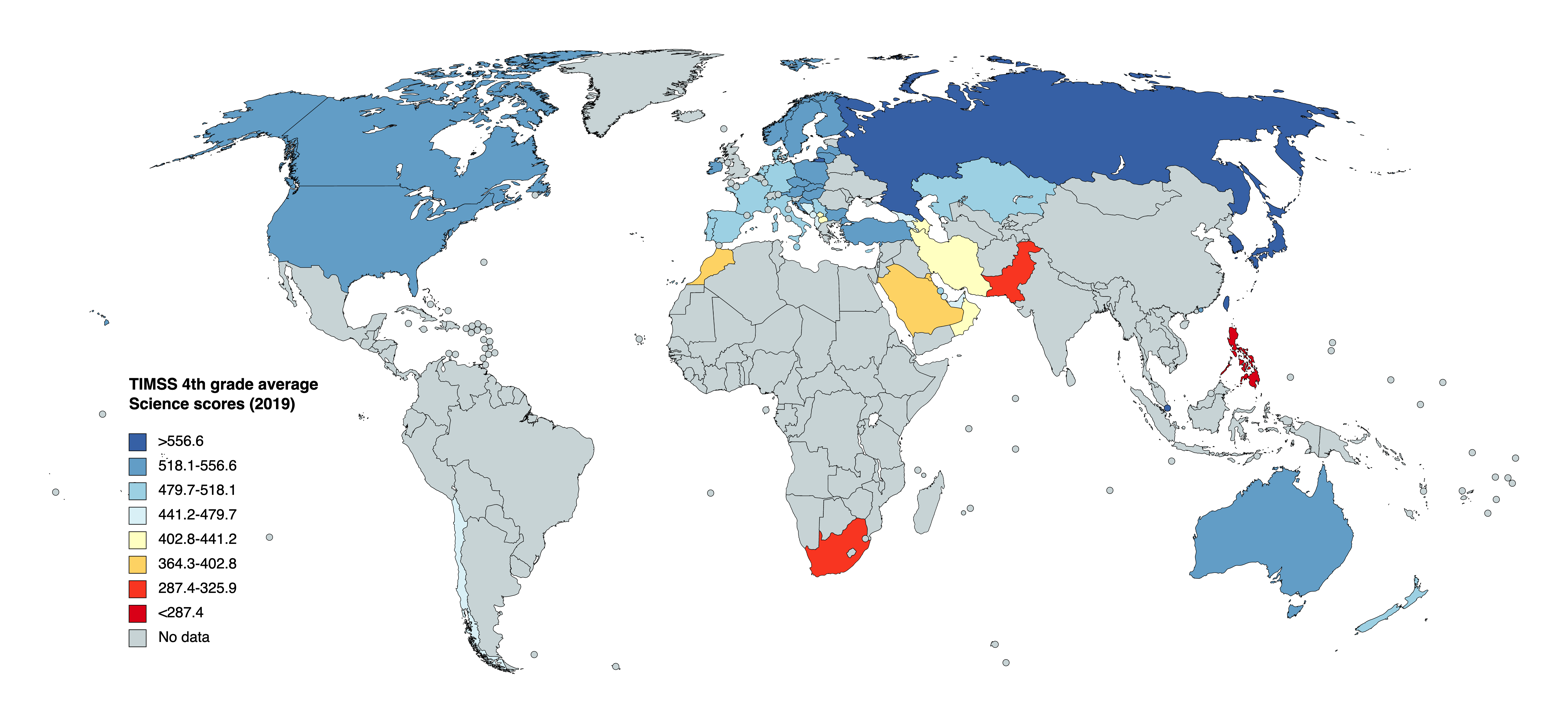
TIMSS 4th grade average Science scores (2019)

The International Association for the Evaluation of Educational Achievement (IEA)'s Trends in International Mathematics and Science Study (TIMSS) is a series of international assessments of the mathematics and science knowledge of students around the world. The participating students come from a diverse set of educational systems (countries or regional jurisdictions of countries) in terms of economic development, geographical location, and population size. In each of the participating educational systems, a minimum of 4,000 to 5,000 students is evaluated. Contextual data about the conditions in which participating students learn mathematics and science are collected from the students and their teachers, their principals, and their parents via questionnaires.

TIMSS is one of the studies established by IEA aimed at allowing educational systems worldwide to compare students' educational achievement and learn from the experiences of others in designing effective education policy. This assessment was first conducted in 1995, and has been administered every four years thereafter. Therefore, some of the participating educational systems have trend data across assessments from 1995 to 2023. TIMSS assesses 4th and 8th grade students, while TIMSS Advanced assesses students in the final year of secondary school in advanced mathematics and physics.

== Definition of terms ==
"Eighth grade" in the United States is approximately 13–14 years of age and equivalent to:

- Year 9 (Y9) in England and Wales
- 2nd Year (S2) in Scotland
- 2nd Year in the Republic of Ireland
- 1st Year in South Africa
- Form 2 in Hong Kong
- 4e in France
- Year 9 in New Zealand
- Form 2 in Malaysia
- 2nd Year in Japan

"Fourth grade" in the United States is approximately equivalent to 9–10 years of age and equivalent to:

- Year 5 (Y5) in England and Wales
- Primary 6 (P6) in Scotland
- Group 6 in the Netherlands
- CM1 in France
- Fourth Class in the Republic of Ireland
- Standard 3 or Year 5 in New Zealand
- 4th Year in Japan

== History ==
A precursor to TIMSS was the First International Mathematics Study (FIMS) performed in 1964 in 11 countries for students aged 13 and in the final year of secondary education (FS) under the auspices of the International Association for the Evaluation of Educational Achievement (IEA). This was followed in 1970–1971 by the First International Science Study (FISS) for students aged 10, 14, and FS. Fourteen countries tested 10-year-olds; 16 countries tested the older two groups. These were replicated between 1980 and 1984.

These early studies were revised and combined by the IEA to create TIMSS, which was first administered in 1995. It was the largest international student assessment study of its time and evaluated students in five grades. In the second cycle (1999) only eighth-grade students were tested. In the next cycles (2003, 2007, 2011, and 2015) both 4th and 8th grade students were assessed. The 2011 cycle was performed in the same year as the IEA's Progress in International Reading Literacy Study (PIRLS), offering a comprehensive assessment of mathematics, science and reading for the countries participating in both studies. The sixth cycle was conducted in 2015, and the results were released in 2016; the data set was published in February 2017. TIMSS 2015 included data collected from parents for the first time. TIMSS Advanced, previously conducted in 1995 and 2008, was also conducted in 2015, and assessed final-year secondary students' achievement in advanced mathematics and physics. Policy-relevant data about curriculum emphasis, technology use, and teacher preparation and training accompanies the TIMSS Advanced results.

The seventh cycle of TIMSS was conducted in 2019 and marked the beginning of the transition to a digital assessment format, with the digital assessment administered to half of participating countries, and the paper assessment administered to the remaining half. 64 countries and 8 benchmarking systems participating in TIMSS 2019. Results were released in December 2020.

== Method, data and documentation ==
Along with the overall students' achievement data, TIMSS comprehensive assessments include data on student performance in various mathematics and science domains (algebra, geometry, biology, chemistry, etc.) and on performance in the problem solving challenges in each of these contexts. In addition, TIMSS provides contextual data on crucial curricular, instructional, and resource-related factors that can impact the teaching and learning process. These data are gathered using student, teacher, school, and curriculum (national) questionnaires filled out by students, teachers, school principals and National Research Coordinators, respectively.

According to the TIMSS 2019 Assessment Frameworks, "The TIMSS mathematics and science achievement scales were created with the first TIMSS assessment in 1995, separately for each subject and each grade. The scale units were established so that 100 points on the scale was equivalent to one standard deviation of the distribution of achievement across all of the countries that participated in TIMSS 1995, and the scale midpoint of 500 was located at the mean of this international achievement distribution. The TIMSS achievement scales were first used for reporting TIMSS results with TIMSS 1995, and all results from subsequent TIMSS assessments have been reported on the same scale metrics, making it possible to measure growth or decline in countries' achievement distributions from assessment to assessment."

Because TIMSS is administered in four-year cycles, it enables participating counties to use the results between the fourth and eighth grades to track the changes in achievement and certain background factors from an earlier study. For example, results of the fourth grade in TIMSS 1995 can be compared with the results of the eighth grade in TIMSS 1999, as fourth graders had become eighth graders in the next cycle of study.

The collected information is presented in different formats. For example, for TIMSS 2019 the results are presented as TIMSS 2019 International Results in Mathematics and Science TIMSS 2019 International Results in Mathematics and Science. The TIMSS 2019 Encyclopedia provides an overview of how mathematics and science are taught in each participating country. Methods and Procedures: TIMSS 2019 Technical Report documents the development of the TIMSS assessments and questionnaires, and describes the methods used. The TIMSS 2019 User Guide for the International Database describes the content and format of the data in the TIMSS 2019 International Database

The IEA has developed an application for working with data from TIMSS and other IEA large-scale assessments called the IEA International Database (IDB) Analyzer. This application allows researchers to combine data files and facilitates some types of statistical analysis (such as computing means, percentages, percentiles, correlations, and estimating single level multiple linear regression). The application takes into account the complex sample structure of the databases when calculating the statistics and their standard errors. It also allows researchers to estimate achievement scores and their standard errors.

For an overview of the IEA study results and interpretation of information, see IEA's Data Visualizer.

== Cycles ==
=== TIMSS 2027 Assessment ===
The official TIMSS 2027 Assessment Frameworks for mathematics and science have been released, providing a detailed blueprint for how the upcoming assessment cycle will be designed and implemented. These frameworks outline the content domains, cognitive domains, and performance expectations for participating grade levels. Compared with previous cycles, they reflect refinements in topic emphasis, updated learning progressions, and stronger alignment with contemporary curricula. In addition, the frameworks include revised contextual questionnaires for students, teachers, and school leaders, aimed at capturing richer background data on instructional practices, school environments, and learning conditions.

In the United States, the Department of Education opened a public comment period in late 2025 to solicit feedback on proposed revisions to the TIMSS 2027 international questionnaires.

=== TIMSS 2023 ===
TIMSS 2023 was the eighth cycle of TIMSS and reported overall achievement as well as results according to international benchmarks, by major content domains (number, algebra, and geometry in mathematics, and earth science, biology, and chemistry in science) and by cognitive domains (knowing, applying, reasoning). TIMSS 2023 collected detailed information about curriculum and curriculum implementation of participating countries and published this information the TIMSS 2023 Encyclopedia: Education Policy and Curriculum in Mathematics and Science.

TIMSS 2023 results are summarized in TIMSS 2023 International Results in Mathematics and Science.".This detailed report presents achievement and contextual data from participating countries and benchmarking entities. The TIMSS 2023 Encyclopedia: Education Policy and Curriculum in Mathematics and Science describes various features of the education systems in each participating country, including the mathematics and science curriculum, professional development requirements for teachers, and methods of monitoring student progress in mathematics and science. Each country's "chapter" in the encyclopedia was authored by that country's TIMSS representative.

England and other countries have analysing their TIMSS 2023 results to understand how student achievement in mathematics and science has evolved since the disruptions caused by the COVID-19 pandemic. In England's case, analysis published in late 2024 and updated in 2025 points to a recovery in average mathematics performance to pre-pandemic levels, as well as notable increases in science scores for both primary (Year 5) and lower secondary (Year 9) students when compared with TIMSS 2019 results. This suggests that schools and students have shown resilience following substantial interruptions to teaching and learning during the pandemic.

==== Eighth grade ====
Mathematics
| Rank | Country | Average scale score | Change over 4 years |
|---|---|---|---|
| 1 | Singapore | 605 | ▼11 points |
| 2 | Chinese Taipei | 602 | ▼10 points |
| 3 | South Korea | 596 | ▼11 points |
| 4 | Japan | 595 | ▲1 point |
| 5 | Hong Kong | 575 | ▼3 points |
| 6 | England | 525 | ▲10 points |
| 7 | Ireland | 522 | ▼2 points |
| 8 | Czech Republic | 518 | N/A |
| 9 | Sweden | 517 | ▲14 points |
| 10 | Lithuania | 514 | ▼6 points |
| 11 | Austria | 512 | N/A |
| 12 | Australia | 509 | ▼8 points |
| 13 | Turkey | 509 | ▲13 points |
| 14 | Hungary | 506 | ▼11 points |
| 15 | Finland | 504 | ▼5 points |
| 16 | Norway (Note: Ninth grade students) | 501 | ▼2 points |
| 17 | Italy | 501 | ▲4 points |
| International average | | 500 | Steady |
| 18 | Malta | 499 | N/A |
| 19 | Romania | 496 | ▲17 points |
| 20 | Cyprus | 494 | ▼7 points |
| 21 | United Arab Emirates | 489 | ▲16 points |
| 22 | United States | 488 | ▼27 points |
| 23 | New Zealand | 485 | ▼14 points |
| 24 | Israel | 487 | ▼32 points |
| 25 | Azerbaijan | 479 | N/A |
| 26 | France | 479 | ▼4 points |
| 27 | Portugal | 475 | ▼25 points |
| 28 | Georgia | 467 | ▲6 points |
| 29 | Kazakhstan | 454 | ▼34 points |
| 30 | Qatar | 451 | ▲8 points |
| 31 | Bahrain | 426 | ▼55 points |
| 32 | Iran | 423 | ▼23 points |
| 33 | Uzbekistan | 421 | NA |
| 34 | Chile | 416 | ▼25 points |
| 35 | Oman | 411 | 0 |
| 36 | Malaysia | 411 | ▼50 points |
| 37 | Kuwait | 399 | ▼4 points |
| 38 | Saudi Arabia | 397 | ▲3 points |
| 39 | South Africa | 397 | ▲8 points |
| 40 | Jordan | 388 | ▼32 points |
| 41 | Palestine | 382 | N/A |
| 42 | Brazil | 378 | N/A |
| 43 | Morocco | 388 | ▼10 points |
| 44 | Ivory Coast | 263 | N/A |
Benchmarking participants
| – | (Emirate of Dubai) Dubai (United Arab Emirates) | 546 | ▲9 points |
| – | (Emirate of Sharjah) Sharjah (United Arab Emirates) | 499 | NA |
| – | (Emirate of Abu Dhabi) Abu Dhabi (United Arab Emirates) | 454 | ▲18 points |

Science
| Rank | Country | Average scale score | Change over 4 years |
|---|---|---|---|
| 1 | Singapore | 606 | ▼2 points |
| 2 | Chinese Taipei | 572 | ▼2 points |
| 3 | Japan | 557 | ▼13 points |
| 4 | South Korea | 545 | ▼16 points |
| 5 | England | 531 | ▲14 points |
| 6 | Finland | 531 | ▼13 points |
| 7 | Turkey | 530 | ▲15 points |
| 8 | Hong Kong | 528 | ▲3 points |
| 9 | Czech Republic | 527 | NA |
| 10 | Ireland | 525 | ▲2 points |
| 11 | Hungary | 522 | ▼8 points |
| 12 | Sweden | 521 | 0 points |
| 13 | Australia | 520 | ▼8 points |
| 14 | Lithuania | 519 | ▼15 points |
| 15 | United States | 513 | ▼9 points |
| 16 | Austria | 512 | N/A |
| 17 | Portugal | 506 | ▼13 points |
| 18 | New Zealand | 502 | ▲3 points |
| 19 | Malta | 501 | N/A |
| 20 | Italy | 501 | ▲1 point |
| International average | | 500 | Steady |
| 21 | Norway | 488 | ▼7 points |
| 22 | United Arab Emirates | 486 | ▲13 points |
| 23 | France | 486 | ▼3 points |
| 24 | Qatar | 481 | ▲5 points |
| 25 | Israel | 481 | ▼32 points |
| 26 | Romania | 466 | ▼4 points |
| 27 | Cyprus | 475 | ▼20 points |
| 28 | Oman | 456 | ▼1 point |
| 29 | Chile | 455 | ▼7 points |
| 30 | Bahrain | 452 | ▼34 points |
| 31 | Georgia | 448 | ▲1 points |
| 32 | Kazakhstan | 443 | ▼35 points |
| 33 | Malaysia | 426 | ▼34 points |
| 34 | Brazil | 420 | N/A |
| 35 | Kuwait | 420 | ▼24 points |
| 36 | Saudi Arabia | 419 | ▼12 points |
| 37 | Iran | 419 | ▼30 points |
| 38 | Jordan | 413 | ▼39 points |
| 39 | Azerbaijan | 411 | N/A |
| 40 | Uzbekistan | 396 | N/A |
| 41 | Palestine | 393 | N/A |
| 42 | South Africa | 362 | ▼8 points |
| 43 | Morocco | 327 | ▼67 points |
| 44 | Ivory Coast | 186 | N/A |
Benchmarking participants
| – | (Emirate of Dubai) Dubai (United Arab Emirates) | 547 | ▲10 points |
| – | (Emirate of Sharjah) Sharjah (United Arab Emirates) | 499 | ▼23 points |
| – | (Emirate of Abu Dhabi) Abu Dhabi (United Arab Emirates) | 443 | ▲23 points |

==== Fourth grade ====
Mathematics
| Rank | Country | Average scale score | Change over 4 years |
|---|---|---|---|
| 1 | Singapore | 615 | ▼10 points |
| 2 | Chinese Taipei | 607 | ▼8 points |
| 3 | South Korea | 594 | N/A |
| 4 | Hong Kong | 594 | ▼8 points |
| 5 | Japan | 591 | ▼2 points |
| 6 | Macau | 582 | N/A |
| 7 | Lithuania | 561 | ▲19 points |
| 8 | Turkey (Note: Fifth grade students) | 553 | ▲30 points |
| 9 | England | 552 | ▼4 point |
| 10 | Poland | 546 | ▲26 points |
| 11 | Ireland | 546 | ▼2 points |
| 12 | Romania | 542 | N/A |
| 13 | Netherlands | 537 | ▼1 points |
| 14 | Latvia | 534 | ▼12 points |
| 15 | Norway | 531 | ▼12 points |
| 16 | Czech Republic | 530 | ▲3 points |
| 17 | Sweden | 530 | ▼9 points |
| 18 | Bulgaria | 530 | ▲15 points |
| 19 | Finland | 529 | ▼3 points |
| 20 | Australia | 525 | ▲9 points |
| 21 | Germany | 524 | ▲3 points |
| 22 | Denmark | 524 | ▼1 points |
| 23 | Serbia | 523 | ▲15 points |
| 24 | Belgium(Flemish) | 521 | ▼11 points |
| 25 | Hungary | 520 | ▼3 point |
| 26 | Portugal | 517 | ▼8 points |
| 27 | United States | 517 | ▼18 point |
| 28 | Cyprus | 516 | ▼16 points |
| 29 | Slovakia | 515 | ▲5 points |
| 30 | Slovenia | 514 | N/A |
| 31 | Italy | 513 | ▼2 points |
| 31 | Armenia | 513 | ▲15 point |
| 33 | Albania | 512 | ▲18 points |
| 34 | Canada | 504 | ▼8 points |
| International average | | 500 | Steady |
| 34 | Spain | 498 | ▼4 points |
| 36 | United Arab Emirates | 498 | ▼17 points |
| 37 | Georgia | 498 | ▼17 points |
| 38 | Azerbaijan | 494 | N/A |
| 39 | New Zealand | 490 | ▲3 points |
| 40 | Belgium(French) | 487 | N/A |
| 41 | Kazakhstan | 487 | ▼25 points |
| 42 | France | 484 | ▼1 points |
| 43 | Montenegro | 477 | ▲5 points |
| 44 | North Macedonia | 474 | ▲2 points |
| 45 | Qatar | 464 | ▲15 points |
| 46 | Bahrain | 462 | ▼18 points |
| 47 | Kosovo | 451 | ▲2 points |
| 48 | Belize | 447 | ▼5 points |
| 49 | Chile | 444 | ▲3 points |
| 50 | Uzbekistan | 443 | N/A |
| 51 | Jordan | 427 | N/A |
| 52 | Oman | 421 | ▼10 points |
| 53 | Iran | 420 | ▼23 points |
| 54 | Saudi Arabia | 420 | ▲23 points |
| 55 | Brazil | 400 | N/A |
| 56 | Morocco | 393 | ▲10 points |
| 57 | Kuwait | 382 | ▼1 points |
| 58 | South Africa | 362 | ▼12 points |
Benchmarking participants
| – | (Emirate of Dubai) Dubai (United Arab Emirates) | 557 | ▲13 points |
| – | Quebec (Canada) | 515 | ▼17 points |
| – | (Emirate of Sharjah) Sharjah (UAE) | 504 | N/A |
| – | Ontario (Canada) | 503 | ▼9 points |
| – | (Emirate of Abu Dhabi) Abu Dhabi (United Arab Emirates) | 459 | ▲22 points |

Science
| Rank | Country | Average scale score | Change over 4 years |
|---|---|---|---|
| 1 | Singapore | 607 | |
| 2 | South Korea | 583 | |
| 3 | Chinese Taipei | 573 | |
| 4 | Turkey | 570 | |
| 5 | England | 556 | |
| 6 | Japan | 555 | |
| 7 | Poland | 550 | |
| 8 | Australia | 550 | |
| 9 | Hong Kong | 545 | |
| 10 | Finland | 542 | |
| 11 | Lithuania | 537 | |
| 12 | Macau | 536 | |
| 13 | Sweden | 533 | |
| 14 | Ireland | 532 | |
| 15 | United States | 532 | |
| 16 | Norway | 530 | |
| 17 | Bulgaria | 530 | |
| 18 | Romania | 526 | |
| 19 | Czech Republic | 526 | |
| 20 | Slovenia | 526 | |
| 21 | Latvia | 526 | |
| 22 | Hungary | 524 | |
| 22 | Denmark | 522 | |
| 24 | Canada | 521 | |
| 24 | Slovakia | 521 | |
| 26 | New Zealand | 517 | |
| 26 | Netherlands | 517 | |
| 26 | Germany | 515 | |
| 29 | Portugal | 511 | |
| 30 | Italy | 511 | |
| 30 | Serbia | 510 | |
| 32 | Spain | 504 | |
| International average | | 500 | Steady |
| 33 | United Arab Emirates | 495 | |
| 34 | Albania | 491 | |
| 35 | Belgium (Flemish) | 599 | |
| 36 | France | 488 | |
| 37 | Cyprus | 487 | |
| 38 | Belgium(French) | 481 | |
| 39 | Chile | 479 | |
| 40 | Bahrain | 475 | |
| 41 | Qatar | 472 | |
| 42 | Kazakhstan | 467 | |
| 43 | Georgia | 465 | |
| 44 | Montenegro | 461 | |
| 45 | Armenia | 457 | |
| 46 | Belize | 448 | |
| 47 | North Macedonia | 439 | |
| 48 | Oman | 433 | |
| 49 | Iran | 432 | |
| 50 | Saudi Arabia | 429 | |
| 51 | Brazil | 425 | |
| 52 | Azerbaijan | 422 | |
| 53 | Jordan | 418 | |
| 54 | Uzbekistan | 412 | |
| 55 | Kosovo | 403 | |
| 56 | Morocco | 390 | |
| 57 | Kuwait | 373 | |
| 58 | South Africa | 308 | |
Benchmarking participants
| – | (Emirate of Dubai) Dubai (United Arab Emirates) | 562 | |
| – | Ontario (Canada) | 525 | |
| – | Quebec (Canada) | 508 | |
| – | (Emirate of Sharjah) Sharjah (UAE) | 503 | |
| – | (Emirate of Abu Dhabi) Abu Dhabi (United Arab Emirates) | 446 | |

=== TIMSS 2019 ===
TIMSS 2019 marked the transition to a digital assessment format, allowing for new and innovative item types. In the digital assessment, students solved problems by interacting with shapes and patterns, arranging items on the screen, dragging and dropping items, and drawing. The digital version of TIMSS 2019 also introduced Problem Solving and Inquiry tasks that simulated real-world and laboratory situations and called for students to integrate and apply process skills and content knowledge. Half of the participating countries took the paper version of TIMSS and half of the participating countries took the digital version of TIMSS.

==== Eighth grade ====
Mathematics
| Rank | Country | Average scale score | Change over 4 years |
|---|---|---|---|
| 1 | Singapore | 616 | ▼5 points |
| 2 | Chinese Taipei | 612 | ▲13 points |
| 3 | South Korea | 607 | ▲1 point |
| 4 | Japan | 594 | ▲8 points |
| 5 | Hong Kong | 578 | ▼16 points |
| 6 | Russia | 543 | ▲5 points |
| 7 | Ireland | 524 | ▲1 point |
| 8 | Lithuania | 520 | ▲9 points |
| 9 | Israel | 519 | ▲8 points |
| 10 | Australia | 517 | ▲12 points |
| 11 | Hungary | 517 | ▲3 points |
| 12 | United States | 515 | ▼3 points |
| 12 | England | 515 | ▼3 points |
| 14 | Finland | 509 | N/A |
| 15 | Norway (Note: Ninth grade students) | 503 | ▼9 points |
| 15 | Sweden | 503 | ▲2 points |
| 17 | Cyprus | 501 | N/A |
| 18 | Portugal | 500 | N/A |
| International average | | 500 | Steady |
| 19 | Italy | 497 | ▲3 points |
| 20 | Turkey | 496 | ▲38 points |
| 21 | Kazakhstan | 488 | ▼40 points |
| 22 | France | 483 | N/A |
| 23 | New Zealand | 482 | ▼11 points |
| 24 | Bahrain | 481 | ▲27 points |
| 25 | Romania | 479 | N/A |
| 26 | United Arab Emirates | 473 | ▲8 points |
| 27 | Georgia | 461 | ▲8 points |
| 27 | Malaysia | 461 | ▼4 points |
| 29 | Iran | 446 | ▲8 points |
| 30 | Qatar | 443 | ▲6 points |
| 31 | Chile | 441 | ▲14 points |
| 32 | Lebanon | 429 | ▼13 points |
| 33 | Jordan | 420 | ▲34 points |
| 34 | Egypt | 413 | ▲21 points |
| 35 | Oman | 411 | ▲8 points |
| 36 | Kuwait | 403 | ▲11 points |
| 37 | Saudi Arabia | 394 | ▲26 points |
| 38 | South Africa | 389 | ▲17 points |
| 39 | Morocco | 388 | ▲4 points |
Benchmarking participants
| – | Moscow (Russia) | 575 | N/A |
| – | Quebec (Canada) | 543 | Steady |
| – | (Emirate of Dubai) Dubai (United Arab Emirates) | 537 | ▲25 points |
| – | Ontario (Canada) | 530 | ▼8 points |
| – | Western Cape (South Africa) | 441 | N/A |
| – | (Emirate of Abu Dhabi) Abu Dhabi (United Arab Emirates) | 436 | ▼6 points |
| – | Gauteng (South Africa) | 421 | N/A |

Science
| Rank | Country | Average scale score | Change over 4 years |
|---|---|---|---|
| 1 | Singapore | 608 | ▲11 points |
| 2 | Chinese Taipei | 574 | ▲5 points |
| 3 | Japan | 570 | ▼1 point |
| 4 | South Korea | 561 | ▲5 points |
| 5 | Russia | 543 | ▼1 point |
| 5 | Finland | 543 | N/A |
| 7 | Lithuania | 534 | ▲15 points |
| 8 | Hungary | 530 | ▲3 points |
| 9 | Australia | 528 | ▲16 points |
| 10 | Ireland | 523 | ▼7 points |
| 11 | United States | 522 | ▲8 points |
| 12 | Sweden | 521 | ▼1 point |
| 13 | Portugal | 519 | N/A |
| 14 | England | 517 | ▼20 points |
| 15 | Turkey | 515 | ▲22 points |
| 16 | Israel | 513 | ▲6 points |
| 17 | Hong Kong | 504 | ▼42 points |
| 18 | Italy | 500 | ▲1 point |
| International average | | 500 | Steady |
| 19 | New Zealand | 499 | ▼14 points |
| 20 | Norway | 495 | ▼14 points |
| 21 | France | 489 | N/A |
| 22 | Bahrain | 486 | ▲20 points |
| 23 | Cyprus | 484 | N/A |
| 24 | Kazakhstan | 478 | ▼55 points |
| 25 | Qatar | 475 | ▲18 points |
| 26 | United Arab Emirates | 473 | ▼4 points |
| 27 | Romania | 470 | N/A |
| 28 | Chile | 462 | ▲8 points |
| 29 | Malaysia | 460 | ▼11 points |
| 30 | Oman | 457 | ▲2 points |
| 31 | Jordan | 452 | ▲26 points |
| 32 | Iran | 449 | ▼7 points |
| 33 | Georgia | 447 | ▲4 points |
| 34 | Kuwait | 444 | ▲33 points |
| 35 | Saudi Arabia | 431 | ▲35 points |
| 36 | Morocco | 394 | ▲1 point |
| 37 | Egypt | 389 | ▲18 points |
| 38 | Lebanon | 377 | ▼21 points |
| 39 | South Africa | 370 | ▲12 points |
Benchmarking participants
| – | Moscow (Russia) | 567 | N/A |
| – | Quebec (Canada) | 548 | ▲18 points |
| – | (Emirate of Dubai) Dubai (United Arab Emirates) | 537 | ▲12 points |
| – | Ontario (Canada) | 522 | ▼2 points |
| – | Western Cape (South Africa) | 439 | N/A |
| – | Gauteng (South Africa) | 422 | N/A |
| – | (Emirate of Abu Dhabi) Abu Dhabi (United Arab Emirates) | 420 | ▼34 points |

==== Fourth grade ====
Mathematics
| Rank | Country | Average scale score | Change over 4 years |
|---|---|---|---|
| 1 | Singapore | 615 | ▲7 points |
| 2 | Chinese Taipei | 607 | ▼13 points |
| 3 | South Korea | 594 | ▼8 points |
| 4 | Hong Kong | 594 | ▲2 points |
| 5 | Japan | 591 | Steady |
| 6 | Macau | 582 | ▲3 points |
| 7 | Lithuania | 561 | ▼4 points |
| 8 | Turkey (Note: Fifth grade students) | 553 | ▲10 points |
| 9 | England | 552 | ▲1 point |
| 10 | Poland | 546 | N/A |
| 11 | Ireland | 546 | ▼6 points |
| 12 | Romania | 542 | ▲7 points |
| 13 | Netherlands | 537 | N/A |
| 14 | Latvia | 534 | ▲8 points |
| 15 | Norway | 531 | ▼4 points |
| 16 | Czech Republic | 530 | ▲5 points |
| 17 | Sweden ' | 532 | ▼14 points |
| 17 | Bulgaria | 530 | ▲9 points |
| 17 | Finland | 529 | ▼3 points |
| 20 | Australia | 525 | ▼16 points |
| 20 | Germany | 524 | ▼14 points |
| 22 | Denmark | 524 | ▼6 points |
| 22 | Serbia | 523 | N/A |
| 24 | Belgium"Flanders" | 521 | ▲2 points |
| 24 | Germany | 521 | ▼1 point |
| 26 | Poland | 520 | ▼15 points |
| 27 | Australia | 516 | ▼1 point |
| 28 | Azerbaijan | 515 | N/A |
| 28 | Bulgaria | 515 | ▼9 points |
| 28 | Italy | 515 | ▲8 points |
| 31 | Kazakhstan | 512 | ▼32 points |
| 31 | Canada | 512 | ▲1 point |
| 33 | Slovakia | 510 | ▲12 points |
| 34 | Croatia | 509 | ▲7 points |
| 34 | Malta | 509 | N/A |
| 36 | Serbia | 508 | ▼10 points |
| 37 | Spain | 502 | ▼3 points |
| International average | | 500 | Steady |
| 38 | Armenia | 498 | N/A |
| 39 | Albania | 494 | N/A |
| 40 | New Zealand | 487 | ▼4 points |
| 41 | France | 485 | ▼3 points |
| 42 | Georgia | 482 | ▲19 points |
| 43 | United Arab Emirates | 481 | ▲29 points |
| 44 | Bahrain | 480 | ▲29 points |
| 45 | North Macedonia | 472 | N/A |
| 46 | Montenegro | 453 | N/A |
| 47 | Bosnia and Herzegovina | 452 | N/A |
| 48 | Qatar | 449 | ▲10 points |
| 49 | Kosovo | 444 | N/A |
| 50 | Iran | 443 | ▲12 points |
| 51 | Chile | 441 | ▼18 points |
| 52 | Oman | 431 | ▲6 points |
| 53 | Saudi Arabia | 398 | ▲15 points |
| 54 | Morocco | 383 | ▲6 points |
| 54 | Kuwait | 383 | ▲30 points |
| 56 | South Africa | 374 | ▼2 points |
| 57 | Pakistan | 328 | N/A |
| 58 | Philippines | 297 | N/A |
Benchmarking participants
| – | Moscow (Russia) | 593 | N/A |
| – | (Emirate of Dubai) Dubai (United Arab Emirates) | 544 | ▲33 points |
| – | Quebec (Canada) | 532 | ▼4 points |
| – | (Community of Madrid) Madrid (Spain) | 518 | N/A |
| – | Ontario (Canada) | 512 | Steady |
| – | (Emirate of Abu Dhabi) Abu Dhabi (United Arab Emirates) | 441 | ▲22 points |

Science
| Rank | Country | Average scale score | Change over 4 years |
|---|---|---|---|
| 1 | Singapore | 595 | ▲5 points |
| 2 | South Korea | 588 | ▼1 point |
| 3 | Russia | 567 | Steady |
| 4 | Japan | 562 | ▼7 points |
| 5 | Chinese Taipei | 558 | ▲3 points |
| 6 | Finland | 555 | ▲1 point |
| 7 | Latvia | 542 | N/A |
| 8 | Norway | 539 | ▲1 point |
| 8 | United States | 539 | ▼7 points |
| 10 | Lithuania | 538 | ▲10 points |
| 11 | Sweden | 537 | ▼3 points |
| 11 | England | 537 | ▲1 point |
| 13 | Czech Republic | 534 | Steady |
| 14 | Australia | 533 | ▲9 points |
| 15 | Hong Kong | 531 | ▼26 points |
| 15 | Poland | 531 | ▼16 points |
| 17 | Hungary | 529 | ▼13 points |
| 18 | Ireland | 528 | ▼1 point |
| 19 | Turkey | 526 | N/A |
| 20 | Croatia | 524 | ▼9 points |
| 21 | Canada | 523 | ▼2 points |
| 22 | Denmark | 522 | ▼5 points |
| 22 | Austria | 522 | N/A |
| 24 | Bulgaria | 521 | ▼15 points |
| 24 | Slovakia | 521 | ▲1 point |
| 26 | Northern Ireland | 518 | ▼2 points |
| 26 | Netherlands | 518 | ▲1 point |
| 26 | Germany | 518 | ▼10 points |
| 29 | Serbia | 517 | ▼8 points |
| 30 | Cyprus | 511 | ▲30 points |
| 30 | Spain | 511 | ▼7 points |
| 32 | Italy | 510 | ▼6 points |
| 33 | Portugal | 504 | ▼4 points |
| 34 | New Zealand | 503 | ▼3 points |
| 35 | Belgium (Flemish) | 501 | ▼11 points |
| International average | | 500 | Steady |
| 36 | Malta | 496 | N/A |
| 37 | Kazakhstan | 494 | ▼56 points |
| 38 | Bahrain | 493 | ▲34 points |
| 39 | Albania | 489 | N/A |
| 40 | France | 488 | ▲1 point |
| 41 | United Arab Emirates | 473 | ▲22 points |
| 42 | Chile | 469 | ▼9 points |
| 43 | Armenia | 466 | N/A |
| 44 | Bosnia and Herzegovina | 459 | N/A |
| 45 | Georgia | 454 | ▲3 points |
| 46 | Montenegro | 453 | N/A |
| 47 | Qatar | 449 | ▲13 points |
| 48 | Iran | 441 | ▲20 points |
| 49 | Oman | 435 | ▲4 points |
| 50 | Azerbaijan | 427 | N/A |
| 51 | North Macedonia | 426 | N/A |
| 52 | Kosovo | 413 | N/A |
| 53 | Saudi Arabia | 402 | ▲12 points |
| 54 | Kuwait | 392 | ▲55 points |
| 54 | Morocco | 374 | ▲17 points |
| 56 | South Africa | 324 | N/A |
| 57 | Pakistan | 290 | N/A |
| 58 | Philippines | 249 | N/A |
Benchmarking participants
| – | Moscow (Russia) | 595 | N/A |
| – | (Emirate of Dubai) Dubai (United Arab Emirates) | 545 | ▲27 points |
| – | Ontario (Canada) | 524 | ▼6 points |
| – | (Community of Madrid) Madrid (Spain) | 523 | N/A |
| – | Quebec (Canada) | 522 | ▼3 points |
| – | (Emirate of Abu Dhabi) Abu Dhabi (United Arab Emirates) | 418 | ▲3 points |

=== TIMSS 2015 ===
In TIMSS 2015, nationally representative samples of students in 57 countries and 7 benchmarking entities participated in the fourth grade assessment, the eighth grade assessment, or both.

==== Eighth grade ====
Mathematics
| Rank | Country | Average scale score | Change over 4 years |
|---|---|---|---|
| 1 | Singapore | 621 | ▲10 points |
| 2 | South Korea | 606 | ▼7 points |
| 3 | Chinese Taipei | 599 | ▼10 points |
| 4 | Hong Kong | 594 | ▲8 points |
| 5 | Japan | 586 | ▲16 points |
| 6 | Russia | 538 | ▼1 point |
| 7 | Kazakhstan | 528 | ▲41 points |
| 8 | Canada | 527 | N/A |
| 9 | Ireland | 523 | N/A |
| 10 | United States | 518 | ▲9 points |
| 10 | England | 518 | ▲11 points |
| 12 | Slovenia | 516 | ▲11 points |
| 13 | Hungary | 514 | ▲9 points |
| 14 | Norway (Note: Ninth grade students) | 512 | N/A |
| 15 | Lithuania | 511 | ▲9 points |
| 15 | Israel | 511 | ▼5 points |
| 17 | Australia | 505 | Steady |
| 18 | Sweden | 501 | ▲17 points |
| International average | | 500 | Steady |
| 19 | Italy | 494 | ▼4 points |
| 19 | Malta | 494 | N/A |
| 21 | New Zealand | 493 | ▲5 points |
| 22 | Malaysia | 465 | ▲25 points |
| 23 | United Arab Emirates | 465 | ▲9 points |
| 24 | Turkey | 458 | ▲6 points |
| 25 | Bahrain | 454 | ▲45 points |
| 26 | Georgia | 453 | ▲22 points |
| 27 | Lebanon | 442 | ▼7 points |
| 28 | Qatar | 437 | ▲27 points |
| 29 | Iran | 436 | ▲21 points |
| 30 | Thailand | 431 | ▲4 points |
| 31 | Chile | 427 | ▲11 points |
| 32 | Oman | 403 | ▲37 points |
| 33 | Kuwait | 392 | N/A |
| 33 | Egypt | 392 | N/A |
| 35 | Botswana | 391 | ▼6 points |
| 36 | Jordan | 386 | ▼20 points |
| 37 | Morocco | 384 | ▲13 points |
| 38 | South Africa | 372 | ▲20 points |
| 39 | Saudi Arabia | 368 | ▼26 points |
Benchmarking participants
| – | Quebec (Canada) | 543 | ▲11 points |
| – | Ontario (Canada) | 522 | ▲10 points |
| – | (Emirate of Dubai) Dubai (United Arab Emirates) | 512 | ▲34 points |
| – | Florida (United States) | 493 | ▼20 points |
| – | Norway (Note: Eighth grade students) | 487 | ▲12 points |
| – | (Emirate of Abu Dhabi) Abu Dhabi (United Arab Emirates) | 442 | ▼7 points |
| – | Buenos Aires (Argentina) | 396 | N/A |

Science
| Rank | Country | Average scale score | Change over 4 years |
|---|---|---|---|
| 1 | Singapore | 597 | ▲7 points |
| 2 | Japan | 571 | ▲13 points |
| 3 | Chinese Taipei | 569 | ▲5 points |
| 4 | South Korea | 556 | ▼4 points |
| 5 | Slovenia | 551 | ▲8 points |
| 6 | Hong Kong | 546 | ▲11 points |
| 7 | Russia | 544 | ▲2 points |
| 8 | England | 537 | ▲4 points |
| 9 | Kazakhstan | 533 | ▲43 points |
| 10 | Ireland | 530 | N/A |
| 10 | United States | 530 | ▲5 points |
| 12 | Hungary | 527 | ▲5 points |
| 13 | Canada | 526 | N/A |
| 14 | Sweden | 522 | ▲13 points |
| 15 | Lithuania | 519 | ▲5 points |
| 16 | New Zealand | 513 | ▲1 point |
| 17 | Australia | 512 | ▼7 points |
| 18 | Norway | 509 | N/A |
| 19 | Israel | 507 | ▼9 points |
| International average | | 500 | Steady |
| 20 | Italy | 499 | ▼2 points |
| 21 | Turkey | 493 | ▲10 points |
| 22 | Malta | 481 | N/A |
| 23 | United Arab Emirates | 477 | ▲12 points |
| 24 | Malaysia | 471 | ▲45 points |
| 25 | Bahrain | 466 | ▲14 points |
| 26 | Qatar | 457 | ▲38 points |
| 27 | Iran | 456 | ▼18 points |
| 27 | Thailand | 456 | ▲5 points |
| 29 | Oman | 455 | ▲35 points |
| 30 | Chile | 454 | ▼7 points |
| 31 | Georgia | 443 | ▲23 points |
| 32 | Jordan | 426 | ▼23 points |
| 33 | Kuwait | 411 | N/A |
| 34 | Lebanon | 398 | ▼8 points |
| 35 | Saudi Arabia | 396 | ▼40 points |
| 36 | Morocco | 393 | ▲17 points |
| 37 | Botswana | 392 | ▼12 points |
| 38 | Egypt | 371 | N/A |
| 39 | South Africa | 358 | ▲26 points |
Benchmarking participants
| – | Quebec (Canada) | 530 | ▲10 points |
| – | (Emirate of Dubai) Dubai (United Arab Emirates) | 525 | ▲40 points |
| – | Ontario (Canada) | 524 | ▲3 points |
| – | Florida (United States) | 508 | ▼22 points |
| – | Norway | 489 | ▼5 points |
| – | (Emirate of Abu Dhabi) Abu Dhabi (United Arab Emirates) | 454 | ▼7 points |
| – | Buenos Aires (Argentina) | 386 | N/A |

==== Fourth grade ====
Mathematics
| Rank | Country | Average scale score | Change over 4 years |
|---|---|---|---|
| 1 | Singapore | 618 | ▲12 points |
| 2 | Hong Kong | 615 | ▲13 points |
| 3 | South Korea | 608 | ▲3 points |
| 4 | Chinese Taipei | 597 | ▲6 points |
| 5 | Japan | 593 | ▲8 points |
| 6 | Northern Ireland | 570 | ▲8 points |
| 7 | Russia | 564 | ▲22 points |
| 8 | Norway (Note: Fifth grade students) | 549 | N/A |
| 9 | Ireland | 547 | ▲20 points |
| 10 | England | 546 | ▲4 points |
| 10 | Belgium (Flemish) | 546 | ▼3 points |
| 12 | Kazakhstan | 544 | ▲43 points |
| 13 | Portugal | 541 | ▲9 points |
| 14 | United States | 539 | ▼2 points |
| 14 | Denmark | 539 | ▲2 points |
| 16 | Lithuania | 535 | ▲1 point |
| 16 | Finland | 535 | ▼10 points |
| 16 | Poland | 535 | ▲54 points |
| 19 | Netherlands | 530 | ▼10 points |
| 20 | Hungary | 529 | ▲14 points |
| 21 | Czech Republic | 528 | ▲17 points |
| 22 | Bulgaria | 524 | N/A |
| 23 | Cyprus | 523 | N/A |
| 24 | Germany | 522 | ▼6 points |
| 25 | Slovenia | 520 | ▲7 points |
| 26 | Sweden | 519 | ▲15 points |
| 27 | Serbia | 518 | ▲2 points |
| 28 | Australia | 517 | ▲1 point |
| 29 | Canada | 511 | N/A |
| 30 | Italy | 507 | ▼1 point |
| 31 | Spain | 505 | ▲23 points |
| 32 | Croatia | 502 | ▲12 points |
| International average | | 500 | Steady |
| 33 | Slovakia | 498 | ▼9 points |
| 34 | New Zealand | 491 | ▲5 points |
| 35 | France | 488 | N/A |
| 36 | Turkey | 483 | ▲14 points |
| 37 | Georgia | 463 | ▲13 points |
| 38 | Chile | 459 | ▼3 points |
| 39 | United Arab Emirates | 452 | ▲18 points |
| 40 | Bahrain | 451 | ▲15 points |
| 41 | Qatar | 439 | ▲26 points |
| 42 | Iran | 431 | Steady |
| 43 | Oman | 425 | ▲40 points |
| 44 | Indonesia | 397 | N/A |
| 45 | Jordan | 388 | N/A |
| 46 | Saudi Arabia | 383 | ▼27 points |
| 47 | Morocco | 377 | ▲42 points |
| 48 | South Africa | 376 | N/A |
| 49 | Kuwait | 353 | ▲11 points |
Benchmarking participants
| – | Florida (United States) | 546 | ▲1 point |
| – | Quebec (Canada) | 536 | ▲3 points |
| – | Ontario (Canada) | 512 | ▼6 points |
| – | (Emirate of Dubai) Dubai (United Arab Emirates) | 511 | ▲43 points |
| – | Norway (Note: Fourth grade students) | 493 | ▼2 points |
| – | Buenos Aires (Argentina) | 432 | N/A |
| – | (Emirate of Abu Dhabi) Abu Dhabi (United Arab Emirates) | 419 | ▲2 points |

Science
| Rank | Country | Average scale score | Change over 4 years |
|---|---|---|---|
| 1 | Singapore | 590 | ▲7 points |
| 2 | South Korea | 589 | ▲2 points |
| 3 | Japan | 569 | ▲10 points |
| 4 | Russia | 567 | ▲15 points |
| 5 | Hong Kong | 557 | ▲22 points |
| 6 | Chinese Taipei | 555 | ▲3 points |
| 7 | Finland | 554 | ▼16 points |
| 8 | Kazakhstan | 550 | ▲55 points |
| 9 | Poland | 547 | ▲42 points |
| 10 | United States | 546 | ▲2 points |
| 11 | Slovenia | 543 | ▲23 points |
| 12 | Hungary | 542 | ▲8 points |
| 13 | Sweden | 540 | ▲7 points |
| 14 | Norway | 538 | N/A |
| 15 | England | 536 | ▲7 points |
| 15 | Bulgaria | 536 | N/A |
| 17 | Czech Republic | 534 | ▼2 points |
| 18 | Croatia | 533 | ▲17 points |
| 19 | Ireland | 529 | ▲13 points |
| 20 | Germany | 528 | Steady |
| 20 | Lithuania | 528 | ▲13 points |
| 22 | Denmark | 527 | ▼1 point |
| 23 | Canada | 525 | N/A |
| 23 | Serbia | 525 | ▲9 points |
| 25 | Australia | 524 | ▲8 points |
| 26 | Slovakia | 520 | ▼12 points |
| 26 | Northern Ireland | 520 | ▲3 points |
| 28 | Spain | 518 | ▲13 points |
| 29 | Netherlands | 517 | ▼14 points |
| 30 | Italy | 516 | ▼8 points |
| 31 | Belgium (Flemish) | 512 | ▲3 points |
| 32 | Portugal | 508 | ▼14 points |
| 33 | New Zealand | 506 | ▲9 points |
| International average | | 500 | Steady |
| 34 | France | 487 | N/A |
| 35 | Turkey | 483 | ▲20 points |
| 36 | Cyprus | 481 | N/A |
| 37 | Chile | 478 | ▼2 points |
| 38 | Bahrain | 459 | ▲10 points |
| 39 | Georgia | 451 | ▼4 points |
| 39 | United Arab Emirates | 451 | ▲23 points |
| 41 | Qatar | 436 | ▲42 points |
| 42 | Oman | 431 | ▲54 points |
| 43 | Iran | 421 | ▼32 points |
| 44 | Indonesia | 397 | N/A |
| 45 | Saudi Arabia | 390 | ▼39 points |
| 46 | Morocco | 357 | ▲93 points |
| 47 | Kuwait | 337 | ▼10 points |
Benchmarking participants
| – | Florida (United States) | 549 | ▲4 points |
| – | Ontario (Canada) | 530 | ▲2 points |
| – | Quebec (Canada) | 525 | ▲9 points |
| – | (Emirate of Dubai) Dubai (United Arab Emirates) | 518 | ▲57 points |
| – | Norway | 493 | ▼1 point |
| – | Buenos Aires (Argentina) | 418 | N/A |
| – | (Emirate of Abu Dhabi) Abu Dhabi (United Arab Emirates) | 415 | ▲4 points |

=== TIMSS 2011 ===
TIMSS 2011 had 52 participating educational systems for the fourth grade and 45 for the eighth grade.

==== Eighth grade ====
Mathematics
| Rank | Country | Average scale score | Change over 4 years |
|---|---|---|---|
| 1 | South Korea | 613 | ▲16 points |
| 2 | Singapore | 611 | ▲18 points |
| 3 | Chinese Taipei | 609 | ▲11 points |
| 4 | Hong Kong | 586 | ▲14 points |
| 5 | Japan | 570 | Steady |
| 6 | Russia | 539 | ▲27 points |
| 7 | Israel | 516 | ▲53 points |
| 8 | Finland | 514 | N/A |
| 9 | United States | 509 | ▲1 point |
| 10 | England | 507 | ▼6 points |
| 11 | Hungary | 505 | ▼12 points |
| 11 | Australia | 505 | ▲9 points |
| 11 | Slovenia | 505 | ▲4 points |
| 14 | Lithuania | 502 | ▼4 points |
| International average | | 500 | Steady |
| 15 | Italy | 498 | ▲18 points |
| 16 | New Zealand | 488 | N/A |
| 17 | Kazakhstan | 487 | N/A |
| 18 | Sweden | 484 | ▼7 points |
| 19 | Ukraine | 479 | ▲17 points |
| 20 | Norway | 475 | ▲6 points |
| 21 | Armenia | 467 | ▼32 points |
| 22 | Romania | 458 | ▼3 points |
| 23 | United Arab Emirates | 456 | N/A |
| 24 | Turkey | 452 | ▲20 points |
| 25 | Lebanon | 449 | Steady |
| 26 | Malaysia | 440 | ▼34 points |
| 27 | Georgia | 431 | ▲21 points |
| 28 | Thailand | 427 | ▼14 points |
| 29 | Republic of Macedonia | 426 | N/A |
| 30 | Tunisia | 425 | ▲5 points |
| 31 | Chile | 416 | N/A |
| 32 | Iran | 415 | ▲12 points |
| 33 | Qatar | 410 | ▲103 points |
| 34 | Bahrain | 409 | N/A |
| 35 | Jordan | 406 | ▼21 points |
| 36 | Palestine | 404 | ▲37 points |
| 37 | Saudi Arabia | 394 | ▲65 points |
| 38 | Indonesia | 386 | ▼11 points |
| 39 | Syria | 380 | ▼15 points |
| 40 | Morocco | 371 | ▼10 points |
| 41 | Oman | 366 | ▼6 points |
| 42 | Ghana | 331 | ▲22 points |
Ninth grade participants
| – | Botswana (Note: Ninth grade students) | 397 | N/A |
| – | South Africa | 352 | N/A |
| – | Honduras | 338 | N/A |
Benchmarking participants
| – | Massachusetts (United States) | 561 | ▲14 points |
| – | Minnesota (United States) | 545 | ▲13 points |
| – | North Carolina (United States) | 537 | N/A |
| – | Quebec (Canada) | 532 | ▲4 points |
| – | Indiana (United States) | 522 | N/A |
| – | Colorado (United States) | 518 | N/A |
| – | Connecticut (United States) | 518 | N/A |
| – | Florida (United States) | 513 | N/A |
| – | Ontario (Canada) | 512 | ▼5 points |
| – | Alberta (Canada) | 505 | N/A |
| – | California (United States) | 493 | N/A |
| – | (Emirate of Dubai) Dubai (United Arab Emirates) | 478 | ▲17 points |
| – | Alabama (United States) | 466 | N/A |
| – | (Emirate of Abu Dhabi) Abu Dhabi (United Arab Emirates) | 449 | N/A |

Science
| Rank | Country | Average scale score | Change over 4 years |
|---|---|---|---|
| 1 | Singapore | 590 | ▲23 points |
| 2 | Chinese Taipei | 564 | ▲3 points |
| 3 | South Korea | 560 | ▲7 points |
| 4 | Japan | 558 | ▲4 points |
| 5 | Finland | 552 | N/A |
| 6 | Slovenia | 543 | ▲5 points |
| 7 | Russia | 542 | ▲12 points |
| 8 | Hong Kong | 535 | ▲5 points |
| 9 | England | 533 | ▼9 points |
| 10 | United States | 525 | ▲5 points |
| 11 | Hungary | 522 | ▼17 points |
| 12 | Australia | 519 | ▲4 points |
| 13 | Israel | 516 | ▲48 points |
| 14 | Lithuania | 514 | ▼5 points |
| 15 | New Zealand | 512 | N/A |
| 16 | Sweden | 509 | ▼2 points |
| 17 | Italy | 501 | ▲6 points |
| 17 | Ukraine | 501 | ▲16 points |
| International average | | 500 | Steady |
| 19 | Norway | 494 | ▲7 points |
| 20 | Kazakhstan | 490 | N/A |
| 21 | Turkey | 483 | ▲29 points |
| 22 | Iran | 474 | ▲15 points |
| 23 | Romania | 465 | ▲3 points |
| 23 | United Arab Emirates | 465 | N/A |
| 25 | Chile | 461 | N/A |
| 26 | Bahrain | 452 | N/A |
| 27 | Thailand | 451 | ▼20 points |
| 28 | Jordan | 449 | ▼33 points |
| 29 | Tunisia | 439 | ▼6 points |
| 30 | Armenia | 437 | ▼51 points |
| 31 | Saudi Arabia | 436 | ▲33 points |
| 32 | Malaysia | 426 | ▼45 points |
| 32 | Syria | 426 | ▼26 points |
| 34 | Palestine | 420 | ▲16 points |
| 34 | Georgia | 420 | ▼1 point |
| 34 | Oman | 420 | ▼3 points |
| 37 | Qatar | 419 | ▲100 points |
| 38 | Republic of Macedonia | 407 | N/A |
| 39 | Lebanon | 406 | ▼8 points |
| 39 | Indonesia | 406 | ▼21 points |
| 41 | Morocco | 376 | ▼26 points |
| 42 | Ghana | 306 | ▲3 points |
Ninth grade participants
| – | Botswana | 404 | N/A |
| – | Honduras | 369 | N/A |
| – | South Africa | 332 | N/A |
Benchmarking participants
| – | Massachusetts (United States) | 567 | ▲11 points |
| – | Minnesota (United States) | 553 | ▲14 points |
| – | Alberta (Canada) | 546 | N/A |
| – | Colorado (United States) | 542 | N/A |
| – | Indiana (United States) | 533 | N/A |
| – | Connecticut (United States) | 532 | N/A |
| – | North Carolina (United States) | 532 | N/A |
| – | Florida (United States) | 530 | N/A |
| – | Ontario (Canada) | 521 | ▼5 points |
| – | Quebec (Canada) | 520 | ▼6 points |
| – | California (United States) | 499 | N/A |
| – | Alabama (United States) | 485 | N/A |
| – | (Emirate of Dubai) Dubai (United Arab Emirates) | 485 | ▼4 points |
| – | (Emirate of Abu Dhabi) Abu Dhabi (United Arab Emirates) | 461 | N/A |

==== Fourth grade ====
Mathematics
| Rank | Country | Average scale score | Change over 4 years |
|---|---|---|---|
| 1 | Singapore | 606 | ▲7 points |
| 2 | South Korea | 605 | N/A |
| 3 | Hong Kong | 602 | ▼5 points |
| 4 | Chinese Taipei | 591 | ▲15 points |
| 5 | Japan | 585 | ▲17 points |
| 6 | Northern Ireland | 562 | N/A |
| 7 | Belgium (Flemish) | 549 | N/A |
| 8 | Finland | 545 | N/A |
| 9 | England | 542 | ▲1 point |
| 9 | Russia | 542 | ▼2 points |
| 11 | United States | 541 | ▲12 points |
| 12 | Netherlands | 540 | ▲5 points |
| 13 | Denmark | 537 | ▲14 points |
| 14 | Lithuania | 534 | ▲4 points |
| 15 | Portugal | 532 | N/A |
| 16 | Germany | 528 | ▲3 points |
| 17 | Ireland | 527 | N/A |
| 18 | Serbia | 516 | N/A |
| 18 | Australia | 516 | Steady |
| 20 | Hungary | 515 | ▲5 points |
| 21 | Slovenia | 513 | ▲11 points |
| 22 | Czech Republic | 511 | ▲25 points |
| 23 | Austria | 508 | ▲3 points |
| 23 | Italy | 508 | ▲1 point |
| 25 | Slovakia | 507 | ▲11 points |
| 26 | Sweden | 504 | ▲1 point |
| 27 | Kazakhstan | 501 | ▼48 points |
| International average | | 500 | Steady |
| 28 | Malta | 496 | N/A |
| 29 | Norway | 495 | ▲22 points |
| 30 | Croatia | 490 | N/A |
| 31 | New Zealand | 486 | ▼6 points |
| 32 | Spain | 482 | N/A |
| 32 | Romania | 482 | N/A |
| 34 | Poland | 481 | N/A |
| 35 | Turkey | 469 | N/A |
| 36 | Azerbaijan | 463 | N/A |
| 37 | Chile | 462 | N/A |
| 38 | Thailand | 458 | N/A |
| 39 | Armenia | 452 | ▼48 points |
| 40 | Georgia | 450 | ▲12 points |
| 41 | Bahrain | 436 | N/A |
| 42 | United Arab Emirates | 434 | N/A |
| 43 | Iran | 431 | ▲29 points |
| 44 | Qatar | 413 | ▲117 points |
| 45 | Saudi Arabia | 410 | N/A |
| 46 | Oman | 385 | N/A |
| 47 | Tunisia | 359 | ▲32 points |
| 48 | Kuwait | 342 | ▲26 points |
| 49 | Morocco | 335 | ▼6 points |
| 50 | Yemen | 248 | ▲24 points |
Sixth grade participants
| – | Botswana (Note: Sixth grade students) | 419 | N/A |
| – | Honduras | 396 | N/A |
| – | Yemen | 348 | N/A |
Benchmarking participants
| – | North Carolina (United States) | 554 | N/A |
| – | Florida (United States) | 545 | N/A |
| – | Quebec (Canada) | 533 | ▲14 points |
| – | Ontario (Canada) | 518 | ▲6 points |
| – | Alberta (Canada) | 507 | ▲2 points |
| – | (Emirate of Dubai) Dubai (United Arab Emirates) | 468 | ▲24 points |
| – | (Emirate of Abu Dhabi) Abu Dhabi (United Arab Emirates) | 417 | N/A |

Science
| Rank | Country | Average scale score | Change over 4 years |
|---|---|---|---|
| 1 | South Korea | 587 | N/A |
| 2 | Singapore | 583 | ▼4 points |
| 3 | Finland | 570 | N/A |
| 4 | Japan | 559 | ▲11 points |
| 5 | Russia | 552 | ▲6 points |
| 5 | Chinese Taipei | 552 | ▼5 points |
| 7 | United States | 544 | ▲5 points |
| 8 | Czech Republic | 536 | ▲21 points |
| 9 | Hong Kong | 535 | ▼19 points |
| 10 | Hungary | 534 | ▼2 points |
| 11 | Sweden | 533 | ▲8 points |
| 12 | Slovakia | 532 | ▲6 points |
| 12 | Austria | 532 | ▲6 points |
| 14 | Netherlands | 531 | ▲8 points |
| 15 | England | 529 | ▼13 points |
| 16 | Denmark | 528 | ▲11 points |
| 16 | Germany | 528 | Steady |
| 18 | Italy | 524 | ▼11 points |
| 19 | Portugal | 522 | N/A |
| 20 | Slovenia | 520 | ▲2 points |
| 21 | Northern Ireland | 517 | N/A |
| 22 | Ireland | 516 | N/A |
| 22 | Croatia | 516 | N/A |
| 22 | Australia | 516 | ▼11 points |
| 22 | Serbia | 516 | N/A |
| 26 | Lithuania | 515 | ▲1 point |
| 27 | Belgium (Flemish) | 509 | N/A |
| 28 | Romania | 505 | N/A |
| 28 | Spain | 505 | N/A |
| 28 | Poland | 505 | N/A |
| International average | | 500 | Steady |
| 31 | New Zealand | 497 | ▼7 points |
| 32 | Kazakhstan | 495 | ▼38 points |
| 33 | Norway | 494 | ▲17 points |
| 34 | Chile | 480 | N/A |
| 35 | Thailand | 472 | N/A |
| 36 | Turkey | 463 | N/A |
| 37 | Georgia | 455 | ▲37 points |
| 38 | Iran | 453 | ▲17 points |
| 39 | Bahrain | 449 | N/A |
| 40 | Malta | 446 | N/A |
| 41 | Azerbaijan | 438 | N/A |
| 42 | Saudi Arabia | 429 | N/A |
| 43 | United Arab Emirates | 428 | N/A |
| 44 | Armenia | 416 | ▼68 points |
| 45 | Qatar | 394 | ▲100 points |
| 46 | Oman | 377 | N/A |
| 47 | Kuwait | 347 | ▼1 point |
| 48 | Tunisia | 346 | ▲28 points |
| 49 | Morocco | 264 | ▼33 points |
| 50 | Yemen | 209 | ▲12 points |
Sixth grade participants
| – | Honduras | 432 | N/A |
| – | Botswana | 367 | N/A |
| – | Yemen | 345 | N/A |
Benchmarking participants
| – | Florida (United States) | 545 | N/A |
| – | Alberta (Canada) | 541 | ▼2 points |
| – | North Carolina (United States) | 538 | N/A |
| – | Ontario (Canada) | 528 | ▼8 points |
| – | Quebec (Canada) | 516 | ▼1 point |
| – | (Emirate of Dubai) Dubai (United Arab Emirates) | 461 | ▲1 point |
| – | (Emirate of Abu Dhabi) Abu Dhabi (United Arab Emirates) | 411 | N/A |

=== TIMSS 2007 ===
In TIMSS 2007, 43 educational systems participated in the fourth grade and 56 educational systems in the eighth grade.

==== Eighth grade ====
Mathematics
| Rank | Country | Average scale score | Change over 4 years |
|---|---|---|---|
| 1 | Chinese Taipei | 598 | ▲13 points |
| 2 | South Korea | 597 | ▲8 points |
| 3 | Singapore | 593 | ▲12 points |
| 4 | Hong Kong | 572 | ▼14 points |
| 5 | Japan | 570 | Steady |
| 6 | Hungary | 517 | ▼12 points |
| 7 | England | 513 | N/A |
| 8 | Russia | 512 | ▲4 points |
| 9 | United States | 508 | ▲4 points |
| 10 | Lithuania | 506 | ▲4 points |
| 11 | Czech Republic | 504 | N/A |
| 12 | Slovenia | 501 | ▲8 points |
| International average | | 500 | ▲33 points |
| 13 | Armenia | 499 | ▲21 points |
| 14 | Australia | 496 | ▼9 points |
| 15 | Sweden | 491 | ▼8 points |
| 16 | Malta | 488 | N/A |
| 17 | Scotland | 487 | ▼11 points |
| 18 | Serbia | 486 | ▲9 points |
| 19 | Italy | 480 | ▼4 points |
| 20 | Malaysia | 474 | ▼34 points |
| 21 | Norway | 469 | ▲8 points |
| 22 | Cyprus | 465 | ▲6 points |
| 23 | Bulgaria | 464 | ▼12 points |
| 24 | Israel | 463 | ▼33 points |
| 25 | Ukraine | 462 | N/A |
| 26 | Romania | 461 | ▼14 points |
| 27 | Bosnia and Herzegovina | 456 | N/A |
| 28 | Lebanon | 449 | ▲16 points |
| 29 | Thailand | 441 | N/A |
| 30 | Turkey | 432 | N/A |
| 31 | Jordan | 427 | ▲3 points |
| 32 | Tunisia | 420 | ▲10 points |
| 33 | Georgia | 410 | N/A |
| 34 | Iran | 403 | ▼8 points |
| 35 | Bahrain | 398 | ▼3 points |
| 36 | Indonesia | 397 | ▼14 points |
| 37 | Syria | 395 | N/A |
| 38 | Egypt | 391 | N/A |
| 39 | Algeria | 387 | N/A |
| 40 | Morocco | 381 | ▼6 points |
| 41 | Colombia | 380 | N/A |
| 42 | Oman | 372 | N/A |
| 43 | Palestine | 367 | ▼23 points |
| 44 | Botswana | 364 | ▼2 points |
| 45 | Kuwait | 354 | N/A |
| 46 | El Salvador | 340 | N/A |
| 47 | Saudi Arabia | 329 | ▼3 points |
| 48 | Ghana | 309 | ▲33 points |
| 49 | Qatar | 307 | N/A |
Benchmarking participants
| – | Massachusetts (United States) | 547 | N/A |
| – | Minnesota (United States) | 532 | N/A |
| – | Quebec (Canada) | 528 | ▼15 points |
| – | Ontario (Canada) | 517 | ▼4 points |
| – | British Columbia (Canada) | 509 | N/A |
| – | (Basque Country (autonomous community)) Basque Country (Spain) | 499 | ▲12 points |
| – | (Emirate of Dubai) Dubai (United Arab Emirates) | 461 | N/A |

Science
| Rank | Country | Average scale score | Change over 4 years |
|---|---|---|---|
| 1 | Singapore | 567 | ▼11 points |
| 2 | Chinese Taipei | 561 | ▼10 points |
| 3 | Japan | 554 | ▲2 points |
| 4 | South Korea | 553 | ▼5 points |
| 5 | England | 542 | N/A |
| 6 | Hungary | 539 | ▼4 points |
| 6 | Czech Republic | 539 | N/A |
| 8 | Slovenia | 538 | ▲18 points |
| 9 | Hong Kong | 530 | ▼26 points |
| 9 | Russia | 530 | ▲16 points |
| 11 | United States | 520 | ▼7 points |
| 12 | Lithuania | 519 | Steady |
| 13 | Australia | 515 | ▼12 points |
| 14 | Sweden | 511 | ▼13 points |
| International average | | 500 | ▲26 points |
| 15 | Scotland | 496 | ▼16 points |
| 16 | Italy | 495 | ▲4 points |
| 17 | Armenia | 488 | ▲27 points |
| 18 | Norway | 487 | ▼7 points |
| 19 | Ukraine | 485 | N/A |
| 20 | Jordan | 482 | ▲7 points |
| 21 | Malaysia | 471 | ▼39 points |
| 21 | Thailand | 471 | N/A |
| 23 | Serbia | 470 | ▲2 points |
| 23 | Bulgaria | 470 | ▼9 points |
| 25 | Israel | 468 | ▼20 points |
| 26 | Bahrain | 467 | ▲29 points |
| 27 | Bosnia and Herzegovina | 466 | N/A |
| 28 | Romania | 462 | ▼8 points |
| 29 | Iran | 459 | ▲6 points |
| 30 | Malta | 457 | N/A |
| 31 | Turkey | 454 | N/A |
| 32 | Syria | 452 | N/A |
| 32 | Cyprus | 452 | ▲11 points |
| 34 | Tunisia | 445 | ▲41 points |
| 35 | Indonesia | 427 | ▲7 points |
| 36 | Oman | 423 | N/A |
| 37 | Georgia | 421 | N/A |
| 38 | Kuwait | 418 | N/A |
| 39 | Colombia | 417 | N/A |
| 40 | Lebanon | 414 | ▲21 points |
| 41 | Egypt | 408 | N/A |
| 41 | Algeria | 408 | N/A |
| 43 | Palestine | 404 | ▼31 points |
| 44 | Saudi Arabia | 403 | ▲5 points |
| 45 | Morocco | 402 | ▲6 points |
| 46 | El Salvador | 387 | N/A |
| 47 | Botswana | 355 | ▼10 points |
| 48 | Qatar | 319 | N/A |
| 49 | Ghana | 303 | ▲48 points |
Benchmarking participants
| – | Massachusetts (United States) | 556 | N/A |
| – | Minnesota (United States) | 539 | N/A |
| – | Quebec (Canada) | 526 | ▼5 points |
| – | Ontario (Canada) | 526 | ▼7 points |
| – | British Columbia (Canada) | 507 | N/A |
| – | (Basque Country (autonomous community)) Basque Country (Spain) | 498 | ▲9 points |
| – | (Emirate of Dubai) Dubai (United Arab Emirates) | 489 | N/A |

==== Fourth grade ====
Mathematics
| Rank | Country | Average scale score | Change over 4 years |
|---|---|---|---|
| 1 | Hong Kong | 607 | ▲32 points |
| 2 | Singapore | 599 | ▲5 points |
| 3 | Chinese Taipei | 576 | ▲12 points |
| 4 | Japan | 568 | ▲3 points |
| 5 | Kazakhstan | 549 | N/A |
| 6 | Russia | 544 | ▲12 points |
| 7 | England | 541 | ▲10 points |
| 8 | Latvia | 537 | ▲1 point |
| 9 | Netherlands | 535 | ▼5 points |
| 10 | Lithuania | 530 | ▼4 points |
| 11 | United States | 529 | ▲11 points |
| 12 | Germany | 525 | N/A |
| 13 | Denmark | 523 | N/A |
| 14 | Australia | 516 | ▲17 points |
| 15 | Hungary | 510 | ▼19 points |
| 16 | Italy | 507 | ▲4 points |
| 17 | Austria | 505 | N/A |
| 18 | Sweden | 503 | N/A |
| 19 | Slovenia | 502 | ▲23 points |
| International average | | 500 | ▲5 points |
| 20 | Armenia | 500 | ▼44 points |
| 21 | Slovakia | 496 | N/A |
| 22 | Scotland | 494 | ▲4 points |
| 23 | New Zealand | 492 | ▼1 point |
| 24 | Czech Republic | 486 | N/A |
| 25 | Norway | 473 | ▲22 points |
| 26 | Ukraine | 469 | N/A |
| 27 | Georgia | 438 | N/A |
| 28 | Iran | 402 | ▲13 points |
| 29 | Algeria | 378 | N/A |
| 30 | Colombia | 355 | N/A |
| 31 | Morocco | 341 | ▼6 points |
| 32 | El Salvador | 330 | N/A |
| 33 | Tunisia | 327 | ▼12 points |
| 34 | Kuwait | 316 | N/A |
| 35 | Qatar | 296 | N/A |
| 36 | Yemen | 224 | N/A |
Benchmarking participants
| – | Massachusetts (United States) | 572 | N/A |
| – | Minnesota (United States) | 554 | N/A |
| – | Quebec (Canada) | 519 | ▲13 points |
| – | Ontario (Canada) | 512 | ▲1 point |
| – | Alberta (Canada) | 505 | N/A |
| – | British Columbia (Canada) | 505 | N/A |
| – | (Emirate of Dubai) Dubai (United Arab Emirates) | 444 | N/A |

Science
| Rank | Country | Average scale score | Change over 4 years |
|---|---|---|---|
| 1 | Singapore | 587 | ▲22 points |
| 2 | Chinese Taipei | 557 | ▲6 points |
| 3 | Hong Kong | 554 | ▲12 points |
| 4 | Japan | 548 | ▲5 points |
| 5 | Russia | 546 | ▲20 points |
| 6 | Latvia | 542 | ▲10 points |
| 6 | England | 542 | ▲2 points |
| 8 | United States | 539 | ▲3 points |
| 9 | Hungary | 536 | ▲6 points |
| 10 | Italy | 535 | ▲19 points |
| 11 | Kazakhstan | 533 | N/A |
| 12 | Germany | 528 | N/A |
| 13 | Australia | 527 | ▲6 points |
| 14 | Slovakia | 526 | N/A |
| 14 | Austria | 526 | N/A |
| 16 | Sweden | 525 | N/A |
| 17 | Netherlands | 523 | ▼2 points |
| 18 | Slovenia | 518 | ▲28 points |
| 19 | Denmark | 517 | N/A |
| 20 | Czech Republic | 515 | N/A |
| 21 | Lithuania | 514 | ▲2 points |
| 22 | New Zealand | 504 | ▼16 points |
| 23 | Scotland | 500 | ▼2 points |
| International average | | 500 | ▲11 points |
| 24 | Armenia | 484 | ▲47 points |
| 25 | Norway | 477 | ▲11 points |
| 26 | Ukraine | 474 | N/A |
| 27 | Iran | 436 | ▲22 points |
| 28 | Georgia | 418 | N/A |
| 29 | Colombia | 400 | N/A |
| 30 | El Salvador | 390 | N/A |
| 31 | Algeria | 354 | N/A |
| 32 | Kuwait | 348 | N/A |
| 33 | Tunisia | 318 | ▲4 points |
| 34 | Morocco | 297 | ▲7 points |
| 35 | Qatar | 294 | N/A |
| 36 | Yemen | 197 | N/A |
Benchmarking participants
| – | Massachusetts (United States) | 571 | N/A |
| – | Minnesota (United States) | 551 | N/A |
| – | Alberta (Canada) | 543 | N/A |
| – | British Columbia (Canada) | 537 | N/A |
| – | Ontario (Canada) | 536 | ▼4 points |
| – | Quebec (Canada) | 517 | ▲17 points |
| – | (Emirate of Dubai) Dubai (United Arab Emirates) | 460 | N/A |

=== TIMSS 2003 ===
In TIMSS 2003, there were 26 educational systems for the fourth grade and 48 for the eighth grade.

==== Eighth grade ====
Mathematics
| Rank | Country | Average scale score | Change over 4 years |
|---|---|---|---|
| 1 | Singapore | 605 | ▲1 point |
| 2 | South Korea | 589 | ▲2 points |
| 3 | Hong Kong | 586 | ▲4 points |
| 4 | Chinese Taipei | 585 | Steady |
| 5 | Japan | 570 | ▼9 points |
| 6 | Belgium (Flemish) | 537 | ▼21 points |
| 7 | Netherlands | 536 | ▼4 points |
| 8 | Estonia | 531 | N/A |
| 9 | Hungary | 529 | ▼3 points |
| 10 | Malaysia | 508 | ▼11 points |
| 10 | Latvia | 508 | N/A |
| 10 | Russia | 508 | ▼18 points |
| 10 | Slovakia | 508 | ▼26 points |
| 14 | Australia | 505 | ▼20 points |
| 15 | United States | 504 | ▲2 points |
| 16 | Lithuania | 502 | ▲20 points |
| 17 | Sweden | 499 | N/A |
| 18 | Scotland | 498 | N/A |
| 19 | Israel | 496 | ▲30 points |
| 20 | New Zealand | 494 | ▲3 points |
| 21 | Slovenia | 493 | ▼37 points |
| 22 | Italy | 484 | ▲5 points |
| 23 | Armenia | 478 | N/A |
| 24 | Serbia | 477 | N/A |
| 25 | Bulgaria | 476 | ▼35 points |
| 26 | Romania | 475 | ▲3 points |
| International average | | 467 | ▼20 points |
| 27 | Norway | 461 | N/A |
| 28 | Moldova | 460 | ▲9 points |
| 29 | Cyprus | 459 | ▼17 points |
| 30 | Republic of Macedonia | 435 | ▼12 points |
| 31 | Lebanon | 433 | N/A |
| 32 | Jordan | 424 | ▼4 points |
| 33 | Iran | 411 | ▼11 points |
| 33 | Indonesia | 411 | ▲8 points |
| 35 | Tunisia | 410 | ▼38 points |
| 36 | Egypt | 406 | N/A |
| 37 | Bahrain | 401 | N/A |
| 38 | Palestine | 390 | N/A |
| 39 | Chile | 387 | ▼5 points |
| 39 | Morocco | 387 | ▲50 points |
| 41 | Philippines | 376 | ▲31 points |
| 42 | Botswana | 366 | N/A |
| 43 | Saudi Arabia | 332 | N/A |
| 44 | Ghana | 276 | N/A |
| 45 | South Africa | 264 | ▼11 points |
Ninth grade participants
| – | England (Note: Ninth grade students) | 498 | N/A |
Benchmarking participants
| – | Quebec (Canada) | 543 | N/A |
| – | Ontario (Canada) | 521 | N/A |
| – | Indiana (United States) | 508 | N/A |
| – | (Basque Country (autonomous community)) Basque Country (Spain) | 487 | N/A |

Science
| Rank | Country | Average scale score | Change over 4 years |
|---|---|---|---|
| 1 | Singapore | 578 | ▲10 points |
| 2 | Chinese Taipei | 571 | ▲2 points |
| 3 | South Korea | 558 | ▲9 points |
| 4 | Hong Kong | 556 | ▲26 points |
| 5 | Estonia | 552 | N/A |
| 5 | Japan | 552 | ▲2 points |
| 7 | Hungary | 543 | ▼9 points |
| 8 | Netherlands | 536 | ▼9 points |
| 9 | United States | 527 | ▲12 points |
| 9 | Australia | 527 | ▼13 points |
| 11 | Sweden | 524 | N/A |
| 12 | Slovenia | 520 | ▼13 points |
| 12 | New Zealand | 520 | ▲10 points |
| 14 | Lithuania | 519 | ▲31 points |
| 15 | Slovakia | 517 | ▼18 points |
| 16 | Belgium (Flemish) | 516 | ▼19 points |
| 17 | Russia | 514 | ▼15 points |
| 18 | Latvia | 512 | N/A |
| 18 | Scotland | 512 | N/A |
| 20 | Malaysia | 510 | ▲18 points |
| 21 | Norway | 494 | N/A |
| 22 | Italy | 491 | ▼2 points |
| 23 | Israel | 488 | ▲20 points |
| 24 | Bulgaria | 479 | ▼39 points |
| 25 | Jordan | 475 | ▲25 points |
| International average | | 474 | ▼14 points |
| 26 | Moldova | 472 | ▲13 points |
| 27 | Romania | 470 | ▼2 points |
| 28 | Serbia | 468 | N/A |
| 29 | Armenia | 461 | N/A |
| 30 | Iran | 453 | ▲5 points |
| 31 | Republic of Macedonia | 449 | ▼9 points |
| 32 | Cyprus | 441 | ▼19 points |
| 33 | Bahrain | 438 | N/A |
| 34 | Palestine | 435 | N/A |
| 35 | Egypt | 421 | N/A |
| 36 | Indonesia | 420 | ▼15 points |
| 37 | Chile | 413 | ▼7 points |
| 38 | Tunisia | 404 | ▼26 points |
| 39 | Saudi Arabia | 398 | N/A |
| 40 | Morocco | 396 | ▲73 points |
| 41 | Lebanon | 393 | N/A |
| 42 | Philippines | 377 | ▲32 points |
| 43 | Botswana | 365 | N/A |
| 44 | Ghana | 255 | N/A |
| 45 | South Africa | 244 | ▲1 point |
Ninth grade participants
| – | England | 544 | N/A |
Benchmarking participants
| – | Ontario (Canada) | 533 | N/A |
| – | Indiana (United States) | 531 | N/A |
| – | Quebec (Canada) | 531 | N/A |
| – | (Basque Country (autonomous community)) Basque Country (Spain) | 489 | N/A |

==== Fourth grade ====
Mathematics
| Rank | Country | Average scale score | Change over 8 years |
|---|---|---|---|
| 1 | Singapore | 594 | ▼31 points |
| 2 | Hong Kong | 575 | ▼12 points |
| 3 | Japan | 565 | ▼32 points |
| 4 | Chinese Taipei | 564 | N/A |
| 5 | Belgium (Flemish) | 551 | N/A |
| 6 | Netherlands | 540 | ▼37 points |
| 7 | Latvia | 536 | N/A |
| 8 | Lithuania | 534 | N/A |
| 9 | Russia | 532 | N/A |
| 10 | England | 531 | ▲18 points |
| 11 | Hungary | 529 | ▼19 points |
| 12 | United States | 518 | ▼27 points |
| 13 | Cyprus | 510 | ▲8 points |
| 14 | Moldova | 504 | N/A |
| 15 | Italy | 503 | N/A |
| 16 | Australia | 499 | ▼47 points |
| International average | | 495 | ▼34 points |
| 17 | New Zealand | 493 | ▼6 points |
| 18 | Scotland | 490 | ▼30 points |
| 19 | Slovenia | 479 | ▼73 points |
| 20 | Armenia | 456 | N/A |
| 21 | Norway | 451 | ▼51 points |
| 22 | Iran | 389 | ▼40 points |
| 23 | Philippines | 358 | N/A |
| 24 | Morocco | 347 | N/A |
| 25 | Tunisia | 339 | N/A |
Benchmarking participants
| – | Indiana (United States) | 533 | N/A |
| – | Ontario (Canada) | 511 | N/A |
| – | Quebec (Canada) | 506 | N/A |

Science
| Rank | Country | Average scale score | Change over 8 years |
|---|---|---|---|
| 1 | Singapore | 565 | ▲18 points |
| 2 | Chinese Taipei | 551 | N/A |
| 3 | Japan | 543 | ▼31 points |
| 4 | Hong Kong | 542 | ▲9 points |
| 5 | England | 540 | ▼11 points |
| 6 | United States | 536 | ▼29 points |
| 7 | Latvia | 532 | N/A |
| 8 | Hungary | 530 | ▼2 points |
| 9 | Russia | 526 | N/A |
| 10 | Netherlands | 525 | ▼28 points |
| 11 | Australia | 521 | ▼41 points |
| 12 | New Zealand | 520 | ▼11 points |
| 13 | Belgium (Flemish) | 518 | N/A |
| 14 | Italy | 516 | N/A |
| 15 | Lithuania | 512 | N/A |
| 16 | Scotland | 502 | ▼34 points |
| 17 | Moldova | 496 | N/A |
| 18 | Slovenia | 490 | ▼56 points |
| International average | | 489 | ▼35 points |
| 19 | Cyprus | 480 | ▲5 points |
| 20 | Norway | 466 | ▼64 points |
| 21 | Armenia | 437 | N/A |
| 22 | Iran | 414 | ▼2 points |
| 23 | Philippines | 332 | N/A |
| 24 | Tunisia | 314 | N/A |
| 25 | Morocco | 304 | N/A |
Benchmarking participants
| – | Indiana (United States) | 553 | N/A |
| – | Ontario (Canada) | 540 | N/A |
| – | Quebec (Canada) | 500 | N/A |

=== TIMSS 1999 ===
In 1999, TIMSS only focused on the eighth grade in 38 educational systems; there was no study done for the fourth grade in that year.

==== Eighth grade ====
Mathematics
| Rank | Country | Average scale score | Change over 4 years |
|---|---|---|---|
| 1 | Singapore | 604 | ▼39 points |
| 2 | South Korea | 587 | ▼20 points |
| 3 | Chinese Taipei | 585 | N/A |
| 4 | Hong Kong | 582 | ▼6 points |
| 5 | Japan | 579 | ▼26 points |
| 6 | Belgium (Flemish) | 558 | ▼7 points |
| 7 | Netherlands | 540 | ▼1 point |
| 8 | Slovakia | 534 | ▼13 points |
| 9 | Hungary | 532 | ▼5 points |
| 10 | Canada | 531 | ▲4 points |
| 11 | Slovenia | 530 | ▼11 points |
| 12 | Russia | 526 | ▼9 points |
| 13 | Australia | 525 | ▼5 points |
| 14 | Finland | 520 | N/A |
| 14 | Czech Republic | 520 | ▼44 points |
| 16 | Malaysia | 519 | N/A |
| 17 | Bulgaria | 511 | ▼29 points |
| 18 | Latvia (Latvian) | 505 | ▲12 points |
| 19 | United States | 502 | ▲2 points |
| 20 | England | 496 | ▼10 points |
| 21 | New Zealand | 491 | ▼17 points |
| International average | | 487 | ▼26 points |
| 22 | Lithuania | 482 | ▲5 points |
| 23 | Italy | 479 | N/A |
| 24 | Cyprus | 476 | ▲2 points |
| 25 | Romania | 472 | ▼10 points |
| 26 | Moldova | 469 | N/A |
| 27 | Thailand | 467 | ▼55 points |
| 28 | Israel | 466 | ▼56 points |
| 29 | Tunisia | 448 | N/A |
| 30 | Republic of Macedonia | 447 | N/A |
| 31 | Turkey | 429 | N/A |
| 32 | Jordan | 428 | N/A |
| 33 | Iran | 422 | ▼6 points |
| 34 | Indonesia | 403 | N/A |
| 35 | Chile | 392 | N/A |
| 36 | Philippines | 345 | N/A |
| 37 | Morocco | 337 | N/A |
| 38 | South Africa | 275 | ▼79 points |

Science
| Rank | Country | Average scale score | Change over 4 years |
|---|---|---|---|
| 1 | Chinese Taipei | 569 | N/A |
| 2 | Singapore | 568 | ▼39 points |
| 3 | Hungary | 552 | ▼2 points |
| 4 | Japan | 550 | ▼21 points |
| 5 | South Korea | 549 | ▼16 points |
| 6 | Netherlands | 545 | ▼15 points |
| 7 | Australia | 540 | ▼5 points |
| 8 | Czech Republic | 539 | ▼35 points |
| 9 | England | 538 | ▼14 points |
| 10 | Finland | 535 | N/A |
| 10 | Slovakia | 535 | ▼9 points |
| 10 | Belgium (Flemish) | 535 | ▼15 points |
| 13 | Slovenia | 533 | ▼27 points |
| 13 | Canada | 533 | ▲2 points |
| 15 | Hong Kong | 530 | ▲8 points |
| 16 | Russia | 529 | ▼9 points |
| 17 | Bulgaria | 518 | ▼47 points |
| 18 | United States | 515 | ▼19 points |
| 19 | New Zealand | 510 | ▼15 points |
| 20 | Latvia (Latvian) | 503 | ▲18 points |
| 21 | Italy | 493 | N/A |
| 22 | Malaysia | 492 | N/A |
| 23 | Lithuania | 488 | ▲12 points |
| International average | | 488 | ▼28 points |
| 24 | Thailand | 482 | ▼43 points |
| 25 | Romania | 472 | ▼14 points |
| 26 | Israel | 468 | ▼56 points |
| 27 | Cyprus | 460 | ▼3 points |
| 28 | Moldova | 459 | N/A |
| 29 | Republic of Macedonia | 458 | N/A |
| 30 | Jordan | 450 | N/A |
| 31 | Iran | 448 | ▼22 points |
| 32 | Indonesia | 435 | N/A |
| 33 | Turkey | 433 | N/A |
| 34 | Tunisia | 430 | N/A |
| 35 | Chile | 420 | N/A |
| 36 | Philippines | 345 | N/A |
| 37 | Morocco | 323 | N/A |
| 38 | South Africa | 243 | ▼83 points |

=== TIMSS 1995 ===
In TIMSS 1995, there were 41 educational systems in five grades (third, fourth, seventh, eighth, and the final year of secondary school).

==== Eighth grade ====
Mathematics
| Rank | Country | Average scale score |
|---|---|---|
| 1 | Singapore | 643 |
| 2 | South Korea | 607 |
| 3 | Japan | 605 |
| 4 | Hong Kong | 588 |
| 5 | Belgium (Flemish) | 565 |
| 6 | Czech Republic | 564 |
| 7 | Slovakia | 547 |
| 8 | Switzerland | 545 |
| 9 | Netherlands | 541 |
| 9 | Slovenia | 541 |
| 11 | Bulgaria | 540 |
| 12 | Austria | 539 |
| 13 | France | 538 |
| 14 | Hungary | 537 |
| 15 | Russia | 535 |
| 16 | Australia | 530 |
| 17 | Ireland | 527 |
| 17 | Canada | 527 |
| 19 | Belgium (French) | 526 |
| 20 | Thailand | 522 |
| 20 | Israel | 522 |
| 22 | Sweden | 519 |
| International average | | 513 |
| 23 | Germany | 509 |
| 24 | New Zealand | 508 |
| 25 | England | 506 |
| 26 | Norway | 503 |
| 27 | Denmark | 502 |
| 28 | United States | 500 |
| 29 | Scotland | 498 |
| 30 | Latvia (Latvian) | 493 |
| 31 | Spain | 487 |
| 31 | Iceland | 487 |
| 33 | Greece | 484 |
| 34 | Romania | 482 |
| 35 | Lithuania | 477 |
| 36 | Cyprus | 474 |
| 37 | Portugal | 454 |
| 38 | Iran | 428 |
| 39 | Kuwait | 392 |
| 40 | Colombia | 385 |
| 41 | South Africa | 354 |

Science
| Rank | Country | Average scale score |
|---|---|---|
| 1 | Singapore | 607 |
| 2 | Czech Republic | 574 |
| 3 | Japan | 571 |
| 4 | South Korea | 565 |
| 4 | Bulgaria | 565 |
| 6 | Netherlands | 560 |
| 6 | Slovenia | 560 |
| 8 | Austria | 558 |
| 9 | Hungary | 554 |
| 10 | England | 552 |
| 11 | Belgium (Flemish) | 550 |
| 12 | Australia | 545 |
| 13 | Slovakia | 544 |
| 14 | Russia | 538 |
| 14 | Ireland | 538 |
| 16 | Sweden | 535 |
| 17 | United States | 534 |
| 18 | Germany | 531 |
| 18 | Canada | 531 |
| 20 | Norway | 527 |
| 21 | New Zealand | 525 |
| 21 | Thailand | 525 |
| 23 | Israel | 524 |
| 24 | Hong Kong | 522 |
| 24 | Switzerland | 522 |
| 26 | Scotland | 517 |
| 26 | Spain | 517 |
| International average | | 516 |
| 28 | France | 498 |
| 29 | Greece | 497 |
| 30 | Iceland | 494 |
| 31 | Romania | 486 |
| 32 | Latvia (Latvian) | 485 |
| 33 | Portugal | 480 |
| 34 | Denmark | 478 |
| 35 | Lithuania | 476 |
| 36 | Belgium (French) | 471 |
| 37 | Iran | 470 |
| 38 | Cyprus | 463 |
| 39 | Kuwait | 430 |
| 40 | Colombia | 411 |
| 41 | South Africa | 326 |

==== Fourth grade ====
Mathematics
| Rank | Country | Average scale score |
|---|---|---|
| 1 | Singapore | 625 |
| 2 | South Korea | 611 |
| 3 | Japan | 597 |
| 4 | Hong Kong | 587 |
| 5 | Netherlands | 577 |
| 6 | Czech Republic | 567 |
| 7 | Austria | 559 |
| 8 | Slovenia | 552 |
| 9 | Ireland | 550 |
| 10 | Hungary | 548 |
| 11 | Australia | 546 |
| 12 | United States | 545 |
| 13 | Canada | 532 |
| 14 | Israel | 531 |
| International average | | 529 |
| 15 | Latvia (Latvian) | 525 |
| 16 | Scotland | 520 |
| 17 | England | 513 |
| 18 | Cyprus | 502 |
| 18 | Norway | 502 |
| 20 | New Zealand | 499 |
| 21 | Greece | 492 |
| 22 | Thailand | 490 |
| 23 | Portugal | 475 |
| 24 | Iceland | 474 |
| 25 | Iran | 429 |
| 26 | Kuwait | 400 |

Science
| Rank | Country | Average scale score |
|---|---|---|
| 1 | South Korea | 597 |
| 2 | Japan | 574 |
| 3 | United States | 565 |
| 3 | Austria | 565 |
| 5 | Australia | 562 |
| 6 | Netherlands | 557 |
| 6 | Czech Republic | 557 |
| 8 | England | 551 |
| 9 | Canada | 549 |
| 10 | Singapore | 547 |
| 11 | Slovenia | 546 |
| 12 | Ireland | 539 |
| 13 | Scotland | 536 |
| 14 | Hong Kong | 533 |
| 15 | Hungary | 532 |
| 16 | New Zealand | 531 |
| International average | | 524 |
| 17 | Norway | 530 |
| 18 | Latvia (Latvian) | 512 |
| 19 | Israel | 505 |
| 19 | Iceland | 505 |
| 21 | Greece | 497 |
| 22 | Portugal | 480 |
| 23 | Cyprus | 475 |
| 24 | Thailand | 473 |
| 25 | Iran | 416 |
| 26 | Kuwait | 401 |

== Additional initiatives ==
The TIMSS 1999 Video Study was a study of eighth-grade mathematics and science teaching in seven countries. The study involved videotaping and analyzing teaching practices in more than one thousand classrooms. In conjunction with the IEA, the study was conducted by the US National Center for Education Statistics, and the US Department of Education under a contract with LessonLab, Inc. of Los Angeles, California.

== Cooperative partners ==
TIMSS depends on the collaboration of a large number of individuals and organizations around the world including the TIMSS & PIRLS International Study Center at Boston College, IEA's offices in Amsterdam and Hamburg, Statistics Canada, and Educational Testing Service (ETS). In the United States, TIMSS is conducted by the National Center for Education Statistics of the US Department of Education. Data for US students is further tracked for ethnic and racial groups. TIMSS is mainly funded by the participating countries. Also, the US National Center for Education Statistics of the US Department of Education and the World Bank provide major support funding for the assessments.

=== United States results by race and ethnicity ===
==== Eighth grade ====
Mathematics
| Race | 2023 | 2019 | 2015 | 2011 | 2007 | 2003 | 1999 | 1995 |
| Race | Score | Score | Score | Score | Score | Score | Score | |
|---|---|---|---|---|---|---|---|---|
| Asian | 580 | 591 | 585 | 568 | 549 | — | — | — |
| White | 516 | 548 | 541 | 530 | 533 | 525 | 525 | 516 |
| Multiracial | 495 | 540 | 521 | 513 | 506 | — | — | — |
| US Average | 488 | 515 | 518 | 509 | 508 | 504 | 502 | 500 |
| Native Hawaiian/Pacific Islander | — | 495 | — | — | — | — | — | |
| Hispanic | 456 | 486 | 492 | 485 | 475 | 465 | 457 | 443 |
| American Indian/Alaska Native | 483 | 477 | — | — | — | — | — | |
| Black | 443 | 445 | 462 | 465 | 457 | 448 | 444 | 419 |

Science
| Race | 2023 | 2019 | 2015 | 2011 | 2007 | 2003 | 1999 | 1995 | |
| Race | Score | Score | Score | Score | Score | Score | Score | | |
|---|---|---|---|---|---|---|---|---|---|
| Asian | 584 | 577 | 573 | 556 | 543 | — | — | — | |
| White | 545 | 543 | 559 | 557 | 553 | 551 | 552 | 547 | 544 |
| Multiracial | 526 | 542 | 547 | 536 | 534 | 522 | — | — | — |
| US Average | 513 | 517 | 522 | 530 | 525 | 520 | 527 | 515 | 534 |
| Hispanic | 482 | 491 | 493 | 502 | 493 | 480 | 482 | 462 | 446 |
| Native Hawaiian/Pacific Islander | 498 | — | — | — | — | — | | | |
| American Indian/Alaska Native | 481 | 497 | — | — | — | — | — | | |
| Black | 466 | 445 | 469 | 470 | 455 | 463 | 438 | 422 | |

==== Fourth grade ====
Mathematics
| Race | 2019 | 2015 | 2011 | 2007 | 2003 | 1995 |
| Race | Score | Score | Score | Score | Score | Score |
|---|---|---|---|---|---|---|
| Asian | 586 | 605 | 583 | 582 | — | — |
| White | 559 | 559 | 559 | 550 | 542 | 541 |
| Multiracial | 554 | 565 | 554 | 534 | — | — |
| US Average | 535 | 539 | 541 | 529 | 518 | 545 |
| American Indian/Alaska Native | 515 | 527 | — | — | — | — |
| Hispanic | 508 | 515 | 520 | 504 | 492 | 493 |
| Native Hawaiian/Pacific Islander | 500 | 502 | — | — | — | — |
| Black | 494 | 495 | 489 | 482 | 472 | 457 |

Science
| Race | 2019 | 2015 | 2011 | 2007 | 2003 | 1995 |
| Race | Score | Score | Score | Score | Score | Score |
|---|---|---|---|---|---|---|
| Asian | 581 | 598 | 570 | 573 | — | — |
| White | 565 | 570 | 568 | 567 | 565 | 572 |
| Multiracial | 561 | 571 | 559 | 550 | — | — |
| US Average | 539 | 546 | 544 | 539 | 536 | 565 |
| American Indian/Alaska Native | 519 | 530 | — | — | — | — |
| Hispanic | 508 | 518 | 517 | 502 | 498 | 503 |
| Black | 497 | 501 | 490 | 488 | 487 | 462 |
| Native Hawaiian/Pacific Islander | 495 | 503 | — | — | — | — |

== All average country scores ==
- TIMSS 1995: 4th grade ; 8th grade
- TIMSS 1999: 8th grade
- TIMSS 2003: 4th grade ; 8th grade
- TIMSS 2007: 4th and 8th grades
- TIMSS 2011: 4th grade ; 8th grade
- TIMSS 2015: 4th and 8th grades
- TIMSS 2019:

== TIMSS and other international math and science studies ==
Hanushek and Woessmann developed a methodology to rescale 14 different international comparisons of math and/or science achievement to make them comparable. This includes the FIMS, FISS, and PISA, mentioned above, with TIMSS.

This methodology is disputed amongst experts. Quantitative methods used in educational and psychological measurement disagree with the approach as it is basically only a linear scale transformation that cannot ensure or examine whether PISA and TIMSS scores are based on the same or at least comparable measurement constructs: The numerical values used to measure shoe size and intelligence can be transformed so that both have the same arithmetic mean and standard deviation, but they still represent two very different characteristics. The equivalency of what is being measured needs to be established in linking studies that utilize well-designed joint data collections such as the TIMSS NAEP link, or IEA's Rosetta Stone.

Wu (2003, 2010) has shown that TIMSS and PISA do not produce exchangeable scores. One reason may be reading load even for mathematics and science items. TIMSS questions focus on the mathematics curricula taught around the world as seen in TIMSS example items, while PISA attempts to assess mathematics embedded in descriptions of situations encountered outside of the classroom, see PISA examples.

== Participating countries ==
| Country | Years |
|---|---|
| Albania | 2019, 2023 |
| Algeria | 2007 |
| Argentina | 2015 (Note: as Buenos Aires (benchmarking only)) |
| Armenia | 2003, 2007, 2011, 2019, 2023 |
| Australia | 1995, 1999, 2003, 2007, 2011, 2015, 2019, 2023 |
| Austria | 1995, 2007, 2011, 2019, 2023 |
| Azerbaijan | 2011, 2019, 2023 |
| Bahrain | 2003, 2007, 2011, 2015, 2019, 2023 |
| Belgium | 1995, (Note: French and Flemish separated) 1999, (Note: Flemish only) 2003, 2011, 2015, 2019, 2023 |
| Bosnia and Herzegovina | 2007, 2019, 2023 |
| Botswana | 2003, 2007, 2011, (Note: 6th and 9th grade only) 2015 (Note: 9th grade only) |
| Brazil | 2023 |
| Bulgaria | 1995, 1999, 2003, 2007, 2015, 2019, 2023 |
| Canada | 1995, 1999, 2003, (Note: as Ontario and Quebec (benchmarking only)) 2007, (Note: as Alberta, British Columbia, Ontario and Quebec (benchmarking only)) 2011, (Note: as Alberta, Ontario and Quebec (benchmarking only)) 2015, 2019, 2023 |
| Chile | 1999, 2003, 2011, 2015, 2019, 2023 |
| Chinese Taipei | 1999, 2003, 2007, 2011, 2015, 2019, 2023 |
| Colombia | 1995, 2007 |
| Croatia | 2011, 2015, 2019 |
| Cyprus | 1995, 1999, 2003, 2007, 2015, 2019, 2023 |
| Czech Republic | 1995, 1999, 2007, 2011, 2015, 2019, 2023 |
| Denmark | 1995, 2007, 2011, 2015, 2019, 2023 |
| Egypt | 2003, 2007, 2015 |
| El Salvador | 2007 |
| England | 1995, 1999, 2003, 2007, 2011, 2015, 2019, 2023 |
| Estonia | 2003 |
| Finland | 1999, 2011, 2015, 2019, 2023 |
| France | 1995, 2015, 2019, 2023 |
| Georgia | 2007, 2011, 2015, 2019, 2023 |
| Germany | 1995, 2007, 2011, 2015, 2019, 2023 |
| Ghana | 2003, 2007, 2011 |
| Greece | 1995 |
| Honduras | 2011 |
| Hong Kong | 1995, 1999, 2003, 2007, 2011, 2015, 2019, 2023 |
| Hungary | 1995, 1999, 2003, 2007, 2011, 2015, 2019, 2023 |
| Iceland | 1995 |
| Indonesia | 1999, 2003, 2007, 2011, 2015 |
| Iran | 1995, 1999, 2003, 2007, 2011, 2015, 2019, 2023 |
| Iraq | 2023 (Note: represented by Kurdistan Region) |
| Ireland | 1995, 2011, 2015, 2019, 2023 |
| Israel | 1995, 1999, 2003, 2007, 2011, 2015, 2023 |
| Italy | 1999, 2003, 2007, 2011, 2015, 2019, 2023 |
| Ivory Coast | 2023 |
| Japan | 1995, 1999, 2003, 2007, 2011, 2015, 2019, 2023 |
| Jordan | 1999, 2003, 2007, 2011, 2015, 2023 |
| Kazakhstan | 2007, 2011, 2015, 2019, 2023 |
| Kosovo | 2019, 2023 |
| Kuwait | 1995, 2007, 2011, 2015, 2019, 2023 |
| Latvia | 1995, (Note: in Latvian) 1999, 2003, 2007, 2019, 2023 |
| Lebanon | 2003, 2007, 2011, 2015 |
| Lithuania | 1995, 1999, 2003, 2007, 2011, 2015, 2019, 2023 |
| Macau | 2023 |
| Malaysia | 1999, 2003, 2007, 2011, 2015, 2023 |
| Malta | 2007, 2011, 2015, 2019, 2023 |
| Moldova | 1999, 2003 |
| Montenegro | 2019, 2023 |
| Morocco | 1999, 2003, 2007, 2011, 2015, 2019, 2023 |
| Netherlands | 1995, 1999, 2003, 2007, 2011, 2015, 2019, 2023 |
| New Zealand | 1995, 1999, 2003, 2007, 2011, 2015, 2019, 2023 |
| North Macedonia | 1999, 2003, 2011, 2019, 2023 |
| Northern Ireland | 2011, 2015, 2019, 2023 |
| Norway | 1995, 2003, 2007, 2011, 2015, 2019, (Note: 5th and 9th grade only) 2023 |
| Oman | 2007, 2011, 2015, 2019, 2023 |
| Pakistan | 2019 |
| Palestine | 2003, 2007, 2011, 2023 |
| Philippines | 1999, 2003, 2019 |
| Poland | 2011, 2015, 2019, 2023 |
| Portugal | 1995, 2011, 2015, 2019, 2023 |
| Qatar | 2007, 2011, 2015, 2019, 2023 |
| Romania | 1995, 1999, 2003, 2007, 2011, 2023 |
| Russia | 1995, 1999, 2003, 2007, 2011, 2015, 2019 |
| Saudi Arabia | 2003, 2007, 2011, 2015, 2019, 2023 |
| Scotland | 1995, 2003, 2007 |
| Serbia | 2003, 2007, 2011, 2015, 2019, 2023 |
| Singapore | 1995, 1999, 2003, 2007, 2011, 2015, 2019, 2023 |
| Slovakia | 1995, 1999, 2003, 2007, 2011, 2015, 2019, 2023 |
| Slovenia | 1995, 1999, 2003, 2007, 2011, 2015, 2023 |
| South Africa | 1995, 1999, 2003, 2011, 2015, 2019, 2023 |
| South Korea | 1995, 1999, 2003, 2007, 2011, 2015, 2019, 2023 |
| Spain | 1995, 2003, (Note: as Basque Country (benchmarking only)) 2007, 2011, 2015, 2019, 2023 |
| Sweden | 1995, 2003, 2007, 2011, 2015, 2023 |
| Switzerland | 1995 |
| Syria | 2007, 2011 |
| Thailand | 1995, 1999, 2007, 2011, 2015 |
| Tunisia | 1999, 2003, 2007, 2011 |
| Turkey | 1999, 2007, 2011, 2015, 2019, 2023 |
| Ukraine | 2007, 2011 |
| United Arab Emirates | 2007, (Note: as Dubai (benchmarking only)) 2011, 2015, 2019, 2023 |
| United States | 1995, 1999, 2003, 2007, 2011, 2015, 2019, 2023 |
| Uzbekistan | 2023 |
| Yemen | 2007, 2011 |

== See also ==
- International Association for the Evaluation of Educational Achievement
- Numeracy
- Programme for International Student Assessment (PISA), an educational ranking among OECD nations
- Progress in International Reading Literacy Study (PIRLS)
- Scientific literacy
