= Progress in International Reading Literacy Study =

International study of fourth graders' literacy

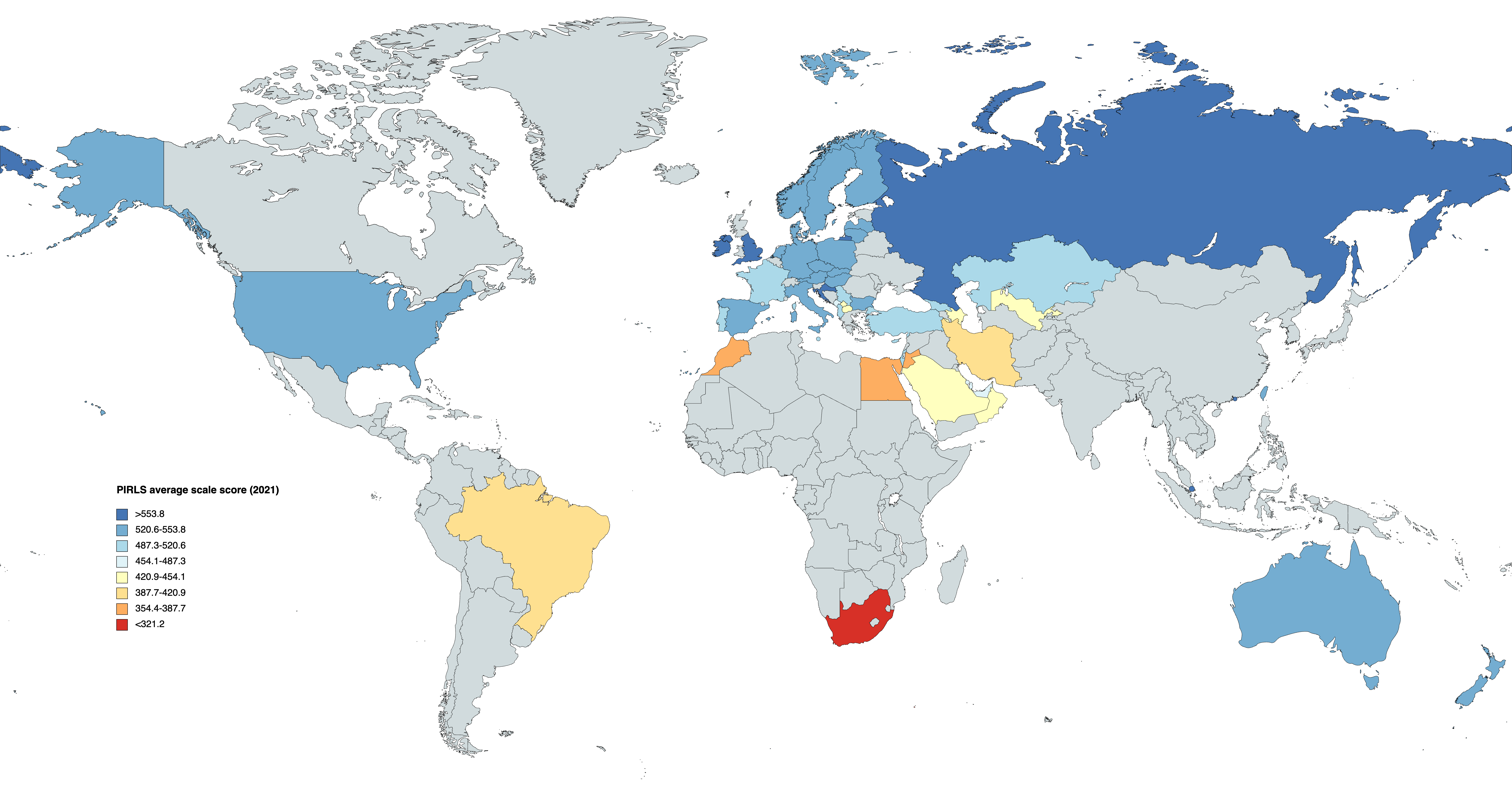
PIRLS 2021

The Progress in International Reading Literacy Study (PIRLS) is an international study of reading (comprehension) achievement in 9–10 year olds. It has been conducted every five years since 2001 by the International Association for the Evaluation of Educational Achievement (IEA). It is designed to measure children's reading literacy achievement, to provide a baseline for future studies of trends in achievement, and to gather information about children's home and school experiences in learning to read.

Over 60 countries and sub-national, benchmarking entities participated in PIRLS 2021.

== History ==
PIRLS provides internationally comparative data on how well children read by assessing students' reading achievement. PIRLS collects background information on how education systems provide educational opportunities to their students as well as the factors that influence how students use these opportunities. These background data include information about the following: national curriculum policies in reading; how the education system is organized to facilitate learning; students' home environment for learning; school climate and resources; and how instruction actually occurs in classrooms. Studies of reading literacy had been conducted prior to the PIRLS study of 2001, and PIRLS is the successor to IEA studies, such as the Reading Literacy Study, that started in 1970 and continued until 1991. The PIRLS study of 2001 started the trend for cyclical testing; PIRLS has a frequency of five years. By administering the test every five years, education systems are able to monitor their children's literacy achievement over time. The current cycle, PIRLS 2016, is the fourth cycle of the IEA PIRLS. Like the previous PIRLS cycles (conducted in 2001, 2006, and 2011), the study will also collect information about home supports for literacy, curriculum and curriculum implementation, instructional practices, and school resources in each participating country.

== Cycles ==
=== PIRLS 2021 ===
PIRLS 2021 is the fifth cycle in the PIRLS framework. IEA's PIRLS will continue to collect background information from the assessed students, their parents, teachers and school principals on how education systems provide educational opportunities to their students, as well as the factors that influence how students use these opportunities. Trend results across assessments permit countries to monitor the effectiveness of their educational systems in a global context, and PIRLS 2021 marks 20 years of trends.

PIRLS 2021 evolves further from PIRLS 2016 in allowing countries to administer the full PIRLS reading assessment, including both PIRLS Informational and Literary (the previous standard PIRLS assessment), and the ePIRLS Online Informational (the previous ePIRLS), as one digitally based endeavour. Countries may also select from two levels of the PIRLS assessment; providing students with an assessment experience better suited to their reading abilities increases student motivation and provides more accurate assessment data. All results will be reported on the same PIRLS achievement scale.

PIRLS 2021 thus offers three options, enabling participants to select the administration path best suited to assessing their education system:(1) A new fully digital ePIRLS assessment, which integrates all aspects of PIRLS Informational, PIRLS Literary, and the ePIRLS Online Informational assessments; 2) The paper-only version of the PIRLS assessment, which is equivalent to the original pen-and-paper PIRLS standard assessment; and (3) The paper-only version of the PIRLS assessment, taken together with the ePIRLS Online Informational assessment.

Rank	Country	Average scale score	Change over 5 years
1	Singapore	587	▲11 points
2	Ireland	577	▲10 points
3	Hong Kong	573	▲4 points
4	Russia	567	▼14 points
5	Northern Ireland	566	▲1 point
6	England (Note: Assessed one year later than originally scheduled)	558	▼1 point
7	Croatia	557	N/A
8	Lithuania	552	▲4 points
9	Finland	549	▼17 points
9	Poland	549	▼16 points
11	United States	548	▼1 point
12	Chinese Taipei	544	▼15 points
12	Sweden	544	▼11 points
14	Australia	540	▼4 points
14	Bulgaria	539	▼13 points
14	Czech Republic	539	▼4 points
17	Hungary	539	▼15 points
17	Denmark	539	▼8 points
17	Norway (Note: 5th grade students)	539	▼20 points
20	Italy	537	▼11 points
21	Macau	536	▼10 points
22	Austria	530	▼11 points
23	Slovakia	529	▼6 points
24	Latvia	528	▼30 points
25	Netherlands	527	▼18 points
26	Germany	524	▼13 points
27	New Zealand	521	▼2 points
27	Spain	521	▼7 points
29	Portugal	520	▼8 points
29	Slovenia	520	▼22 points
30	Malta	515	▲63 points
31	France	514	▲3 points
31	Serbia	514	N/A
33	Albania	513	N/A
34	Cyprus	511	N/A
34	Belgium (Flemish)	511	▼14 points
36	Israel	510	▼20 points
37	Kazakhstan	504	▼32 points
PIRLS Scale Centerpoint		500	Steady
38	Turkey	496	N/A
39	Belgium (French)	494	▼3 points
39	Georgia	494	▲6 points
41	Montenegro	487	N/A
42	Qatar	485	▲43 points
43	United Arab Emirates	483	▲33 points
44	Bahrain	458	▲12 points
45	Saudi Arabia	449	▲19 points
46	North Macedonia	442	N/A
47	Azerbaijan	440	▼32 points
48	Uzbekistan	437	N/A
49	Oman	429	▲11 points
50	Kosovo	421	N/A
51	Brazil	419	N/A
52	Iran	413	▼15 points
53	Jordan	381	N/A
54	Egypt	378	▲48 points
55	Morocco	372	▲14 points
56	South Africa	288	▼32 points
Benchmarking participants
–	Moscow (Russia)	598	▼14 points
–	(Emirate of Dubai) Dubai (United Arab Emirates)	552	▲37 points
–	Quebec (Canada)	551	▲4 points
–	Alberta (Canada)	539	N/A
–	British Columbia (Canada)	535	N/A
–	Newfoundland and Labrador (Canada)	523	N/A
–	(Emirate of Abu Dhabi) Abu Dhabi (United Arab Emirates)	440	▲26 points
–	South Africa (Note: 6th grade students)	384	N/A

Table key
Delayed assessment of 4th grade cohort at the beginning of 5th grade

=== PIRLS 2016 ===
PIRLS 2016 was released on December 5, 2017. It also collects extensive information about home supports for literacy, curriculum and curriculum implementation, instructional practices, and school resources in each participating country. In this cycle there were two additional initiatives: (1) the PIRLS Literacy assessment (earlier known as prePIRLS) is equivalent to PIRLS in scope and reflects the same conception of reading as PIRLS. Its purpose is to extend the effective measurement of reading literacy at the lower end of the achievement scale. Countries whose fourth-grade students are still developing fundamental reading skills can participate in the PIRLS Literacy assessment and still have their results reported on the PIRLS achievement scale. The reading passages and questions in common between the PIRLS Literacy and the PIRLS assessments will enable the two assessments to be linked, and their results to be compared. (2) Initiated in 2016, ePIRLS is a computer-based reading assessment of students' ability to acquire and use information when reading online. The assessment encompasses an engaging, simulated internet environment with authentic school-like assignments about science and social studies topics. The ePIRLS online reading achievement scale enables countries to examine their fourth-graders' online reading performance relative to their performance on the PIRLS reading achievement scales.

In terms of trends, the PIRLS results for student achievement by country states that 18 countries had higher average achievement, 13 countries had the same average achievement, and 10 countries had lower average achievement; and girls had higher reading achievement than boys in 48 of the 50 countries.

The 2016 PIRLS Encyclopedia has the Education Policy and Curriculum in Reading by country. It describes the structure of each education system, the reading curricula in the primary grades, and overall policies related to reading instruction.

The ten countries with the highest average reading achievement were: Russian Federation, Singapore, Hong Kong SAR, Ireland, Finland, Poland, Northern Ireland, Norway, Taiwan, and England.

Rank	Country	Average scale score	Change over 5 years
1	Russia	581	▲13 points
2	Singapore	576	▲9 points
3	Hong Kong	569	▼2 points
4	Ireland	567	▲15 points
5	Finland	566	▼2 points
6	Poland	565	▲39 points
6	Northern Ireland	565	▲7 points
8	Norway (Note: 5th grade students)	559	▲52 points
8	Chinese Taipei	559	▲6 points
8	England	559	▲7 points
11	Latvia	558	N/A
12	Sweden	555	▲13 points
13	Hungary	554	▲15 points
14	Bulgaria	552	▲20 points
15	United States	549	▼7 points
16	Lithuania	548	▲20 points
16	Italy	548	▲7 points
18	Denmark	547	▼7 points
19	Macau	546	N/A
20	Netherlands	545	▼1 point
21	Australia	544	▲17 points
22	Czech Republic	543	▼2 points
22	Canada	543	▼5 points
24	Slovenia	542	▲12 points
25	Austria	541	▲12 points
26	Germany	537	▼4 points
27	Kazakhstan	536	N/A
28	Slovakia	535	Steady
29	Israel	530	▼11 points
30	Portugal	528	▼13 points
30	Spain	528	▲15 points
32	Belgium (Flemish)	525	N/A
33	New Zealand	523	▼8 points
34	France	511	▼9 points
International average		500	Steady
35	Belgium (French)	497	▼9 points
36	Chile	494	N/A
37	Georgia	488	Steady
38	Trinidad and Tobago	479	▲8 points
39	Azerbaijan	472	▲10 points
40	Malta	452	▼25 points
41	United Arab Emirates	450	▲11 points
42	Bahrain	446	N/A
43	Qatar	442	▲17 points
44	Saudi Arabia	430	Steady
45	Iran	428	▼29 points
46	Oman	418	▲27 points
47	Kuwait	393	N/A
48	Morocco	358	▲48 points
49	Egypt	330	N/A
50	South Africa	320	N/A
Benchmarking participants
–	Moscow (Russia)	612	N/A
–	(Community of Madrid) Madrid (Spain)	549	N/A
–	Quebec (Canada)	547	▲9 points
–	Ontario (Canada)	544	▼8 points
–	Andalusia (Spain)	525	▲10 points
–	Norway (Note: 4th grade students)	517	N/A
–	(Emirate of Dubai) Dubai (United Arab Emirates)	515	▲39 points
–	Denmark (Note: 3rd grade students)	501	N/A
–	Buenos Aires (Argentina)	480	N/A
–	(Emirate of Abu Dhabi) Abu Dhabi (United Arab Emirates)	414	▼10 points
–	South Africa (English/Afrikaans/Zulu)	406	N/A

==== Helpful pages ====
- "Listing of reading achievement scores by country - PIRLS 2016".
- "Trends in reading scores by country - PIRLS 2016".
- "Links to each country for their education system, 4th grade curriculum, etc. - PIRLS 2016".

=== PIRLS 2011 ===
Combining newly developed reading assessment passages and questions for 2011 with a selection of secure assessment passages and questions from 2001 and 2006, the study offered a state-of-the-art assessment of reading comprehension that allowed for measurement of changes since 2001. The international population for PIRLS 2011 consisted of students in the grade that represents four years of schooling, provided that the mean age at the time of testing was at least 9.5 years. In the 2011 cycle, prePIRLS (now known as PIRLS Literacy) was offered to assess basic reading skills as a bridge to PIRLS, for countries where most children are still developing fundamental reading skills at the end of the primary school cycle.

Rank	Country	Average scale score	Change over 5 years
1	Hong Kong	571	▲7 points
2	Russia	568	▲3 points
2	Finland	568	N/A
4	Singapore	567	▲9 points
5	Northern Ireland	558	N/A
6	United States	556	▲16 points
7	Denmark	554	▲8 points
8	Croatia	553	N/A
8	Chinese Taipei	553	▲18 points
10	Ireland	552	N/A
10	England	552	▲13 points
12	Canada	548	N/A
13	Netherlands	546	▼1 point
14	Czech Republic	545	N/A
15	Sweden	542	▼7 points
16	Italy	541	▼10 points
16	Germany	541	▼7 points
16	Israel	541	▲29 points
16	Portugal	541	N/A
20	Hungary	539	▼12 points
21	Slovakia	535	▲3 points
22	Bulgaria	532	▼15 points
23	New Zealand	531	▼1 point
24	Slovenia	530	▲8 points
25	Austria	529	▼9 points
26	Lithuania	528	▼9 points
27	Australia	527	N/A
28	Poland	526	▲7 points
29	France	520	▼2 points
30	Spain	513	Steady
31	Norway	507	▲9 points
32	Belgium (French)	506	▲6 points
33	Romania	502	▲13 points
International average		500	Steady
34	Georgia	488	▲17 points
35	Malta	477	N/A
36	Trinidad and Tobago	471	▲35 points
37	Azerbaijan	462	N/A
38	Iran	457	▲36 points
39	Colombia	448	N/A
40	United Arab Emirates	439	N/A
41	Saudi Arabia	430	N/A
42	Indonesia	428	▲23 points
43	Qatar	425	▲72 points
44	Oman	391	N/A
45	Morocco	310	▼13 points
6th grade participants
–	Honduras (Note: 6th grade students)	450	N/A
–	Morocco	424	N/A
–	Kuwait	419	N/A
–	Botswana	419	N/A
Benchmarking participants
–	Florida (United States)	569	N/A
–	Ontario (Canada)	552	▼3 points
–	Alberta (Canada)	548	▼12 points
–	Quebec (Canada)	538	▲5 points
–	Andalusia (Spain)	515	N/A
–	(Emirate of Dubai) Dubai (United Arab Emirates)	476	N/A
–	Malta (Maltese)	457	N/A
–	(Emirate of Abu Dhabi) Abu Dhabi (United Arab Emirates)	424	N/A
–	South Africa (English/Afrikaans) (Note: 5th grade students)	421	N/A

=== PIRLS 2006 ===
PIRLS 2006 assessed a range of reading comprehension strategies for two major reading purposes: literary and informational. The student test of reading comprehension addressed four processes:

- retrieval of explicitly stated information
- making straightforward inferences
- interpreting and integrating ideas and information
- examination and evaluation of content, language, and textual elements.

PIRLS 2006 assessed students enrolled in the fourth grade.

Rank	Country	Average scale score	Change over 5 years
1	Russia	565	▲37 points
2	Hong Kong	564	▲36 points
3	Alberta (Canada)	560	N/A
4	Singapore	558	▲30 points
4	British Columbia (Canada)	558	N/A
6	Luxembourg	557	N/A
7	Ontario (Canada)	555	N/A
8	Italy	551	▲10 points
8	Hungary	551	N/A
10	Sweden	549	▼12 points
11	Germany	548	▲9 points
12	Netherlands	547	▼7 points
12	Belgium (Flemish)	547	N/A
12	Bulgaria	547	▼3 points
15	Denmark	546	N/A
16	Nova Scotia (Canada)	542	N/A
17	Latvia	541	▼4 points
18	United States	540	▼2 points
19	England	539	▼14 points
20	Austria	538	N/A
21	Lithuania	537	▼6 points
22	Chinese Taipei	535	N/A
23	Quebec (Canada)	533	N/A
24	New Zealand	532	▲3 points
24	Slovakia	532	▲15 points
26	Scotland	527	▼1 point
27	France	522	▼3 points
27	Slovenia	522	▲20 points
29	Poland	519	N/A
30	Spain	513	N/A
31	Israel	512	▲3 points
32	Iceland	511	▼1 point
International average		500	Steady
33	Moldova	500	▲8 points
33	Belgium (French)	500	N/A
35	Norway	498	▼1 point
36	Romania	489	▼23 points
37	Georgia	471	N/A
38	Republic of Macedonia	442	Steady
39	Trinidad and Tobago	436	N/A
40	Iran	421	N/A
41	Indonesia	405	N/A
42	Qatar	353	N/A
43	Kuwait	330	▼66 points
44	Morocco	323	▼27 points
45	South Africa	302	N/A

=== PIRLS 2001 ===
The IEA Progress in International Reading Literacy Study (PIRLS) 2001 was the first cycle of assessments to measure trends in children's reading literacy achievement, and policy and practices related to literacy. The study examined three aspects of reading literacy: processes of comprehension, purposes for reading, and reading literacy behavior and attitudes. 35 countries took part in the first cycle where students enrolled in the fourth grade were assessed.

Rank	Country	Average scale score
1	Sweden	561
2	Netherlands	554
3	England	553
4	Bulgaria	550
5	Latvia	545
6	Canada (Note: Represented by Ontario (548) and Quebec (487))	544
7	Lithuania	543
7	Hungary	543
9	United States	542
10	Italy	541
11	Germany	539
12	Czech Republic	537
13	New Zealand	529
14	Scotland	528
14	Singapore	528
14	Russia	528
14	Hong Kong	528
18	France	525
19	Greece	524
20	Slovakia	518
21	Iceland	512
21	Romania	512
23	Israel	509
24	Slovenia	502
International average		500
25	Norway	499
26	Cyprus	494
27	Moldova	492
28	Turkey	449
29	Republic of Macedonia	442
30	Colombia	422
31	Argentina	420
32	Iran	414
33	Kuwait	396
34	Morocco	350
35	Belize	327

== United States results by race and ethnicity ==
Race	2016	2011	2006	2001
Race	Score	Score	Score	Score
Asian	591	588	567	551
Multiracial	—	578	—	—
White	571	575	560	565
US Average	549	556	540	542
Other	545	—	573	—
Hispanic	525	532	518	517
Black	518	522	503	502
American Indian/Alaska Native	—	—	468	—

== PIRLS assessment ==
The PIRLS study consists of a main survey that consists of a written reading comprehension test and a background questionnaire. The PIRLS Reading Development Group (RDG) and National Research Coordinators (NRCs) from the participating countries collaborate to develop the reading assessments. The assessment focuses on three main areas of literacy: process of comprehension, purposes for reading, and reading behaviors and attitudes. The background questionnaire is used to determine the reading behaviors and attitudes. The written test is designed to address the process of comprehension and the purposes for reading. There are two purposes for reading that are examined in this study: reading for literary experience and reading to acquire and use information. Each student receives 80 minutes to complete two passages and then time to complete the survey. There are a total of 8 passage. Four passages are for each purpose of reading. "With eight reading passages in total, but just two to be given to any one student, passages and their accompanying items were assigned to student test booklets according to a matrix sampling plan. The eight passages were distributed across 10 booklets, two per booklet, so that passages were paired together in a booklet in as many different ways as possible." The PIRLS target population is the grade that represents four years of schooling, counting from the first year of ISCED Level 1, which corresponds to the fourth grade in most countries. To better match the assessment to the achievement level of students, countries have the option of administering PIRLS or PIRLS Literacy at the fifth or sixth grade.

== Background questionnaire ==
Given to:

- Home/parents—This questionnaire includes questions about "students' early reading experiences, child-parent literacy interactions, parents' reading habits and attitudes, home-school connections, and demographic and socioeconomic indicators."
- Students—This questionnaire includes questions about "instructional experiences, self-perception and attitudes towards reading, out-of-school reading habits, computer use, home literacy resources, and basic demographic information."
- Teachers—This questionnaire includes questions about "characteristics of the class tested, instructional activities for teaching reading, classroom resources, assessment practices, and about their education, training, and opportunities for professional development."
- Schools—This questionnaire includes questions about "enrollment and school characteristics, school organization for reading instruction, school staffing and resources, home-school connections, and the school environment."

== Participating organizations ==
- International Association for the Evaluation of Educational Achievement with offices in Amsterdam and Hamburg
- International Study Center at Boston College
- Statistics Canada
- Educational Testing Services in Princeton, NJ
- National Foundation for Educational Research in England and Wales (NFER) in the United Kingdom
- Reading Development Group (RDG)

== Participating countries ==
Country	Years
Albania	2021
Argentina	2001, 2016 (Note: as Buenos Aires (benchmarking only))
Australia	2011, 2016, 2021
Austria	2006, 2011, 2016, 2021
Azerbaijan	2011, 2016, 2021
Bahrain	2016, 2021
Belize	2001
Belgium	2006, (Note: French and Flemish separated) 2011, (Note: French only) 2016, 2021
Botswana	2011 (Note: 6th grade only)
Brazil	2021
Bulgaria	2001, 2006, 2011, 2016, 2021
Canada	2001, (Note: represented by Ontario and Quebec) 2006, (Note: as Alberta, British Columbia, Nova Scotia, Ontario, and Quebec) 2011, 2016, 2021 (Note: as Alberta, British Columbia, Newfoundland and Labrador and Quebec (benchmarking only))
Chile	2016
Chinese Taipei	2006, 2011, 2016, 2021
Colombia	2001, 2011
Croatia	2011, 2021
Cyprus	2006, 2021
Czech Republic	2001, 2011, 2016, 2021
Denmark	2006, 2011, 2016, 2021
Egypt	2016, 2021
England	2001, 2006, 2011, 2016, 2021
Finland	2011, 2016, 2021
France	2001, 2006, 2011, 2016, 2021
Georgia	2006, 2011, 2016, 2021
Germany	2001, 2006, 2011, 2016, 2021
Greece	2001
Honduras	2011
Hong Kong	2001, 2006, 2011, 2016, 2021
Hungary	2001, 2006, 2011, 2016, 2021
Iceland	2001, 2006
Indonesia	2006, 2011
Iran	2001, 2006, 2011, 2016, 2021
Ireland	2011, 2016, 2021
Israel	2001, 2006, 2011, 2016, 2021
Italy	2001, 2006, 2011, 2016, 2021
Jordan	2021
Kazakhstan	2016, 2021
Kosovo	2021
Kuwait	2001, 2006, 2011, 2016
Latvia	2001, 2006, 2016, 2021
Lithuania	2001, 2006, 2011, 2016, 2021
Macau	2016, 2021
Malta	2011, 2016, 2021
Moldova	2001, 2006
Montenegro	2021
Morocco	2001, 2006, 2011, 2016, 2021
Netherlands	2001, 2006, 2011, 2016, 2021
New Zealand	2001, 2006, 2011, 2016, 2021
North Macedonia	2001, 2006, 2021
Northern Ireland	2011, 2016, 2021
Norway	2001, 2006, 2011, 2016, 2021
Oman	2011, 2016, 2021
Poland	2021
Portugal	2011, 2016, 2021
Qatar	2006, 2011, 2016, 2021
Romania	2001, 2006, 2011
Russia	2001, 2006, 2011, 2016, 2021
Saudi Arabia	2011, 2016, 2021
Scotland	2001, 2006
Serbia	2021
Singapore	2001, 2006, 2011, 2016, 2021
Slovakia	2001, 2006, 2011, 2016, 2021
Slovenia	2001, 2006, 2011, 2016, 2021
South Africa	2006, 2011, (Note: English/Afrikaans (benchmarking only)) 2016, 2021
Spain	2006, 2011, 2016, 2021
Sweden	2001, 2006, 2011, 2016, 2021
Trinidad and Tobago	2006, 2011, 2016
Turkey	2001, 2021
United Arab Emirates	2011, 2016, 2021
United States	2001, 2006, 2011, 2016, 2021
Uzbekistan	2021

== See also ==
- International Association for the Evaluation of Educational Achievement
- Programme for International Student Assessment (PISA), an educational ranking among OECD nations
- Trends in International Mathematics and Science Study (TIMSS)
