= Expatriate social capital =

Social capital among people living overseas

Social capital is the product of human interactions and relationships, which occur between individuals and social networks. Therefore, it can be summarized as the shared links, understandings and values that allow individuals and groups to trust each other, and therefore, to work with each other in society.

In the case of expatriation—the process through which an individual lives and works in a country other than their country of citizenship, often temporarily and for work reasons—, social capital has been identified as an important factor for expatriate career success, performance, cultural and psychological adjustment, and international knowledge transfers, among other topics.

== General definitions of social capital ==
Given the long history of the social capital concept, a range of definitions have emerged over the years, especially since the topic gained more prominence in the 1990s. Still, the most cited definitions in 2019 belonged to Pierre Bourdieu, Robert Putnam, Nan Lin, James Coleman, and Janine Nahapiet and Sumantra Ghoshal. The table below shows some of the definitions these authors put forward:

Social capital definitions
Bourdieu	“the aggregate of the actual or potential resources which are linked to possession of a durable network of more or less institutionalized relationships of mutual acquaintance or recognition” “made up of social obligations (‘connections’), which is convertible, in certain conditions, into economic capital and may be institutionalized in the form of a title of nobility”.
Putnam	“features of social organization such as networks, norms, and social trust that facilitate coordination and cooperation for mutual benefit”.
Lin	“resources embedded in a social structure that are accessed and/or mobilized in purposive actions”.
Coleman	“Social capital is defined by its function. It is not a single entity, but a variety of different entities having two characteristics in common: They all consist of some aspect of social structure, and they facilitate certain actions of individuals who are within the structure”.
Nahapiet and Ghoshal	“the sum of the actual and potential resources embedded within, available through, and derived from the network of relationships possessed by an individual or social unit. Social capital thus comprises both the network and the assets that may be mobilized through that network”.

== Expatriate social capital in International Human Resource Management ==
=== Social resources theory ===
According to social resources theory, there are a number of resources embedded in a person's social network and social ties, including material goods and intangible items—for instance, trust, values, or status. In this way, individuals can benefit from their social ties and use them as resources when they are able to receive information and support through them to achieve certain goals and objectives.

Expatriate social capital is distinct from other forms of social capital because it usually involves social connections across a range of different countries. Additionally, it has especial relevance for International Human Resource Management (IHRM) because it can be viewed as a resource, not only useful for expatriates themselves, but also for the multinational companies and enterprises (MNCs and MNEs) employing them.

=== Business expatriates ===
Historically, the use of the term expatriate has been inconsistent and varied. For this reason, it is important to know that IHRM concerns a specific type of expatriate: the business expatriate. According to McNulty and Brewster, who argued that a concise and universal definition should be adopted, business expatriates are “legally working individuals who reside temporarily in a country of which they are not a citizen in order to accomplish a career-related goal, being relocated abroad either by an organization, by self-initiation or directly employed within the host-country”.

=== Organizational knowledge benefits of expatriate social capital. ===
Needless to say, individuals can share their resources with others. In the case of expatriates, they can transfer the knowledge they earned through their social resources during international experiences to the organizations they work for. As a result, organizations can leverage expatriate social capital to improve inter-unit learning inside the firm, learn about external business opportunities, train other personnel (such as future expatriates and/or leaders) and gain a competitive advantage in the international economy.

==== Transfer of inpatriate and repatriate social capital ====
For instance, if an inpatriate (a kind of expatriate who is from a foreign country, but is transferred from a foreign subsidiary to the corporation's headquarters; Harvey, Novicevic and Speier, 1999) has large social networks in the host country, it will be positively related to firm-specific learning.

Similarly, research carried out with expatriates after an international assignment (usually called repatriates) also suggests that the benefits of the social ties developed abroad exceeds the period of the assignment, facilitating knowledge flows across units in an organization.
