= Ronald Stuart Burt =

American sociologist

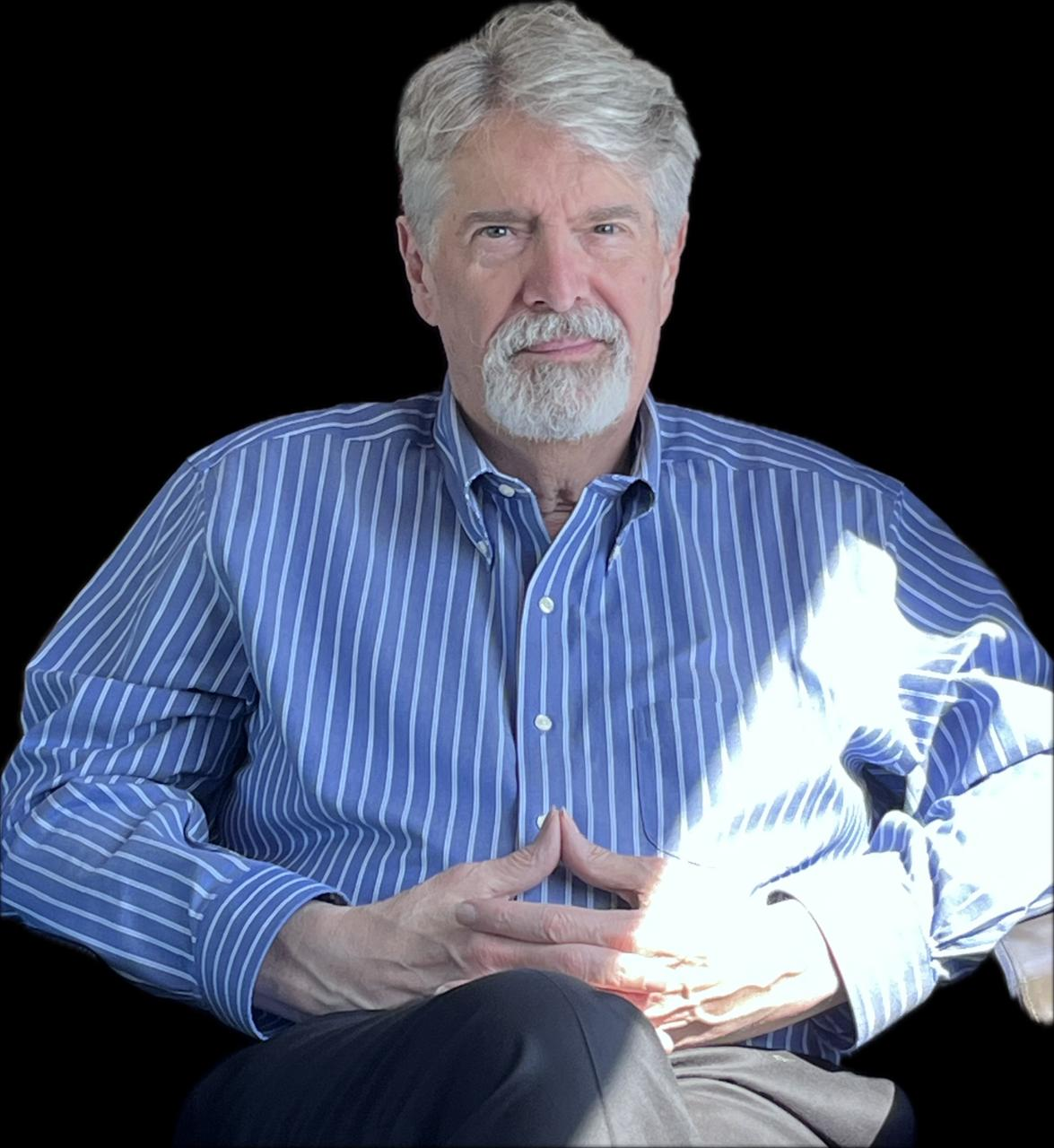
- Born: 1949 (age 76–77)
- Citizenship: United States
- Education: Johns Hopkins University (B.A., 1971); University at Albany, SUNY (M.S., 1973); University of Chicago (Ph.D., 1977)
- Known for: Structural holes, network models of social capital
- Awards: Distinguished Scholar of Organizations and Management Theory, Academy of Management (2007); Fellow, American Academy of Arts and Sciences (1993); Fellow, Center for Advanced Study in the Behavioral Sciences (1984)
- Scientific career
- Fields: Mathematical sociology, social networks
- Workplaces: Bocconi University (2020– ) University of Chicago (1993– ) Columbia University (1982–1993); University of California, Berkeley (1976–1983)
- Doctoral advisor: James Samuel Coleman

Ronald Stuart Burt (born 1949) is an American sociologist. He is the Charles M. Harper Leadership Professor Emeritus of Sociology and Strategy at the University of Chicago Booth School of Business and a distinguished professor at Bocconi University. He is most notable for his research and writing on social networks and social capital, particularly the concept of structural holes. His work describes how networks create competitive advantage, with applications focusing on personal networks and the network structure of markets.

== Biography ==
=== Education and early career ===
Originally a pre-medical major, Burt earned his B.A. in social and behavioral sciences from Johns Hopkins University in 1971, with a focus on social psychology. From 1970 to 1973, he worked as a research assistant to Nan Lin at the Center for Research in Scientific Communication at Johns Hopkins and at the State University of New York at Albany. He earned an M.A. in Sociology from the State University of New York at Albany in 1973 working with Nan Lin. He moved to the University of Chicago to work with mathematical sociology professor James Samuel Coleman, also serving as a research assistant to Coleman at the National Opinion Research Center from 1973 to 1976, and earned his Ph.D. in sociology in 1977. His dissertation committee also included social network analyst Edward Laumann.

== Academic career ==
After completing his doctorate, Burt held an appointment as assistant professor of sociology at the University of California, Berkeley from 1976, rising to acting associate professor. He held a concurrent visiting associate professorship at the State University of New York at Albany in 1978–79.

He joined Columbia University in 1982 as associate professor of sociology, was promoted to full professor in 1984, and became professor of sociology and business in 1990, serving as chair of the Columbia sociology department before leaving in 1993.

Burt joined the University of Chicago Booth School of Business in 1993. He served as Professor of Sociology and Strategy from 1993 to 1996, then as Hobart W. Williams Professor of Sociology and Strategy from 1996 to 2019, and as the Charles M. Harper Leadership Professor of Sociology and Strategy from 2019 to 2024, transitioning to emeritus status in 2024. Since 2020, he has also held the position of distinguished professor at Bocconi University in Milan.

== Research ==
=== Structural holes ===
Burt's most influential contribution is the theory of structural holes, introduced in his 1992 book Structural Holes: The Social Structure of Competition. The theory replaces the traditional economic contrast between perfect competition and monopoly with a network model of competition. The basic element is the structural hole: a gap between two individuals with complementary resources or information. Substantial competitive advantage occurs for an intermediary, a network broker, coordinating from one individual to the other.

People whose networks bridge structural holes between groups have an advantage in detecting and developing rewarding opportunities. Information arbitrage is their central advantage: They are able to see earlier, see more broadly, and translate information across groups. In the terminology of classical sociology, a player who derives benefit from structural holes by brokering relationships between otherwise disconnected players is called tertius gaudens — "the third who benefits."

Burt's 2004 paper "Structural Holes and Good Ideas," published in the American Journal of Sociology, extended the structural holes argument to creativity and innovation, providing empirical evidence from an American electronics company that compensation, positive performance evaluations, promotions, and good ideas are disproportionately in the hands of people whose networks span structural holes. Between-group brokers are more likely to express ideas, less likely to have ideas dismissed, and more likely to have ideas evaluated as valuable

=== Brokerage and closure ===
In his 2005 book Brokerage and Closure: An Introduction to Social Capital, based on his 2001 Oxford Clarendon Lectures in Management, Burt synthesized the structural holes argument with James Coleman's competing closure argument. Cohesive, closed networks are social capital to the extent that they facilitate collective action by sustaining trust and enforcing norms. Rather than opposing the brokerage and closure arguments, Burt showed they are complementary, resolving the tension through the concept of structural autonomy. The best path to performance lies in combining a cohesive internal group with diverse external contacts, as opposed to the worst configuration of a fragmented group with homogeneous external contacts.

=== Neighbor networks and competitive advantage ===
In Neighbor Networks: Competitive Advantage Local and Personal (2010), Burt extended his framework to address how network advantage varies with individual and local context, arguing that the benefits of brokerage depend substantially on the person at the center of the network and the immediate neighborhood in which they operate. The book won the 2011 Academy of Management George R. Terry Book Award.

=== Later research ===
Burt's more recent work has examined the role of social networks among Chinese and other Asian entrepreneurs, the dynamics of guanxi (relationship networks) in Chinese business contexts, and the relationship between network position and leadership perceptions. His 2026 book Strong Bridges: Trust Beyond Structure, co-authored with Sonja Opper, argues from Chinese evidence that the key to the competitive advantage of brokerage is the subset of "strong" bridge connections grounded in cathartic events back in the history of a person's career. A preliminary report on the book was published in 2024 in the American Journal of Sociology.

== Honors and awards ==
Burt was elected a Fellow of the American Academy of Arts and Sciences in 1993 and was elected to the Sociological Research Association in 1986. He held a fellowship at the Center for Advanced Study in the Behavioral Sciences in 1984–85, and a fellowship at the Netherlands Institute for Advanced Study in 1990.

His book awards include the 2011 Academy of Management George R. Terry Book Award for Neighbor Networks and finalist status for the same prize in 2006 for Brokerage and Closure. In 2007, he received the Academy of Management Distinguished Scholar Award in Organization and Management Theory. In 2017, he received the Simmel Award from the International Network for Social Network Analysis. In 2022, he shared the Progress in Mathematical Sociology award (with Harrison White and Ronald Breiger) for scholarship on the concept of structural equivalence.

His editorial and professional service has included membership on the editorial boards of the Academy of Management Journal and the American Journal of Sociology; chairing the American Sociological Association's Rational Choice Section; service on the National Science Foundation General Social Survey Board of Overseers; and editing the journal Rationality and Society.

== Publications ==
=== Books ===
- Burt, Ronald S.; Opper, Sonja (2026). Strong bridges: trust beyond structure. Social network mechanisms. New York, NY: Oxford University Press. ISBN 978-0-19-783428-2.
- Burt, Ronald S. (2010). Neighbor Networks: Competitive Advantages Local and Personal. Oxford University Press. ISBN 978-0-19-969191-3.
- Burt, Ronald S. (2005). Brokerage and Closure: An Introduction to Social Capital. Oxford University Press. ISBN 978-0-19-924915-2.
- Burt, Ronald S. (1992). Structural holes: the social structure of competition. Harvard University Press. ISBN 978-0-674-84371-4.
- Burt, Ronald S.; Minor, Michael J., eds. (1983). Applied Network Analysis: A Methodological Introduction. Sage Publications. ISBN 978-0-8039-1907-5.
- Burt, Ronald S. (1982). Toward a Structural Theory of Action: Network Models of Social Structure, Perception, and Action. Academic Press. ISBN 978-0-12-147150-7.

=== Highly-cited articles ===
- Burt, R S (1980). "Models of Network Structure". Annual Review of Sociology. 6 (1): 79–141. Bibcode:1980ARSoc...6...79B. doi:10.1146/annurev.so.06.080180.000455. ISSN 0360-0572.
- Burt, Ronald S. (1987). "Social Contagion and Innovation: Cohesion versus Structural Equivalence". American Journal of Sociology. 92 (6): 1287–1335. Bibcode:1987AmJSo..92.1287B. doi:10.1086/228667. ISSN 0002-9602. S2CID 22380365.
- Burt, Ronald S. (2000). "The network structure of social capital". Research in Organizational Behavior. 22: 345–423. doi:10.1016/S0191-3085(00)22009-1. ISSN 0191-3085.
- Burt, Ronald S. (2004). "Structural Holes and Good Ideas". American Journal of Sociology. 110 (2): 349–399. doi:10.1086/421787. ISSN 0002-9602. S2CID 2152743.
