= Youtz =

Youtz is a surname. Notable people with the surname include:

- Byron Youtz, acting president of Reed College in summer 1968
- Cleo Youtz (1909–2005), American statistician
- Gregory Youtz, composer, 1984 Charles Ives Prize winner
- Karena Youtz, poet and song lyricist in Poetry Bus Tour, sister of Ralf
- Ralf Youtz (born 1972), American rock drummer, brother of Karena
