= Edward Laumann =

American sociologist (born 1938)

Edward O. Laumann
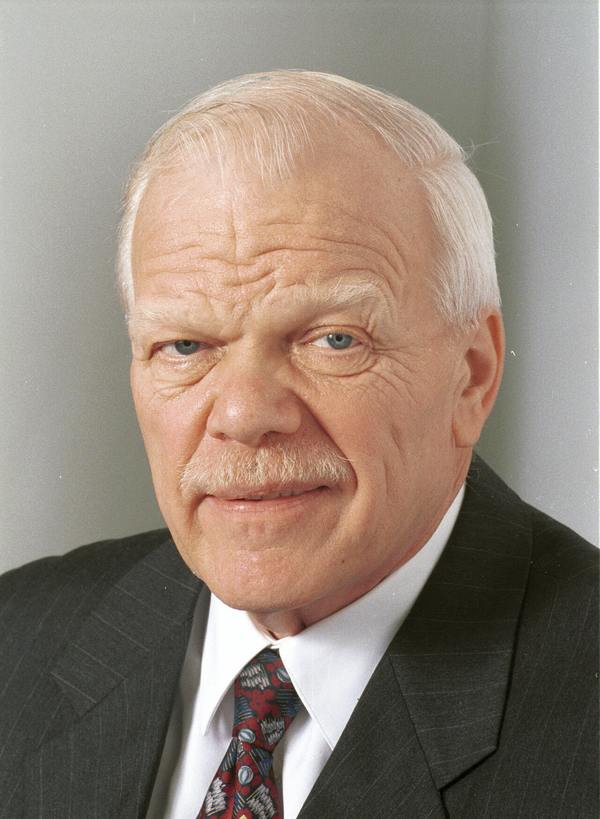
- Edward Laumann (Chicago, circa 2000)
- Born: August 31, 1938 (age 88); Youngstown, Ohio
- Education: Harvard University, Oberlin College
- Known for: Contributions to social network analysis, organizational sociology, sociology of sexuality
- Scientific career
- Fields: Sociology
- Workplaces: University of Michigan, University of Chicago
- Doctoral advisor: George C. Homans
- Other academic advisors: Talcott Parsons, Harrison White
- Notable students: Ronald Stuart Burt, Benjamin Cornwell, Paula England, Joseph Galaskiewicz, Robert M. Hauser, Peter Marsden, Kazuo Yamaguchi, Nora Cate Schaeffer

Edward Otto Laumann (born August 31, 1938) is an American sociologist. He is professor emeritus in the Department of Sociology at the University of Chicago. Laumann earned his Ph.D. in the Harvard Department of Social Relations in 1964, where he worked with George Homans, Talcott Parsons, and Harrison White. He served as Dean of the social sciences and Provost at Chicago. He is best known for his work on social stratification, urban sociology, organizational sociology, health and aging, and is widely recognized as a pioneer in the areas of social network analysis and the sociology of sexuality. In 2013, he was elected to the American Academy of Arts and Sciences.

== Biography ==
Edward O. Laumann was born to Otto and Emalyn (Bauch) Laumann in 1938 near Youngstown, Ohio. He enrolled in Oberlin College in 1956 and earned his B.A. in sociology (summa cum laude) in 1960 with a minor in economics. He earned his Ph.D. in sociology at Harvard four years later in 1964, writing a dissertation titled Urban Social Stratification. While at Harvard, he was a research assistant for Talcott Parsons, who was on his dissertation committee along with George Homans and Harrison White. Laumann was hired as an assistant professor of sociology at the University of Michigan in 1964, where he was the principal investigator of the Detroit Area Study. He moved to the University of Chicago in 1973, where he would eventually serve as the chair of the Department of Sociology, the dean of the Social Sciences, as well as the provost of the university. He was the editor of the American Journal of Sociology from 1978 to 1984 and from 1995 to 1997. He is currently the chairman of the board of trustees of the National Opinion Research Center (NORC) at the University of Chicago.

== Scholarly career ==
Laumann is known for his pioneering work in several areas of sociology. He is one of the founders of the field of social network analysis, and wrote some of the foundational work on networks of elites, organizational networks, and egocentric networks. He is equally well known for his work in the sociology of sexuality, both for his theoretical and empirical contributions to the field and for his years-long fight against Congress for funds to collect national data on American sexual norms and practices in the wake of the AIDS crisis. His Ph.D. students have included, among others, Ronald Burt, Paula England, Joseph Galaskiewicz, Robert M. Hauser, and Kazuo Yamaguchi.

=== Social network analysis ===
In the mid-1960s, Laumann introduced the idea of studying individual social networks via surveys - an approach that led to the creation of widely available network data such as those in the General Social Survey. Inspired in part by W. Lloyd Warner's structural approach to social class, Laumann used individual-level social network data to demonstrate the ethnoreligious and class-based structuring of broader social networks. This work highlighted the tension individuals experience between their subjective preference to associate with people who are like them (the "like-me" hypothesis) and the sometimes contradictory desire to affiliate with higher-status individuals (the "prestige" hypothesis). Laumann argued that individuals' resolution of these impulses forms the basis of class consciousness within a given society. Laumann also defined the "boundary specification problem", which refers to the theoretical and methodological challenge of determining the appropriate set of actors and connections to analyze in order to identify the relevant social network within a given setting.

In the 1980s and 1990s, Laumann and colleagues published the first studies of the inter-organizational network of national policy interests in Washington, D.C. These are the most exhaustive empirical studies of the social networks of national organizations to date. They demonstrate that major public policy in important domains such as health and energy are shaped by latent social connections that exist among the leaders of numerous networked organizations (e.g., lay voluntary associations, federal agencies, and professional societies). Policy decisions are disproportionately shaped by organizations that have vested interests in the outcomes of domain-specific issues and those that have greater capacity to monitor events and to obtain information/resources by virtue of their positions within the interorganizational network. At the same time, organizations' positions within these networks varies by domain, such that there is no single core set of organizations that dominates resource or influence flows across different policy domains. These studies forged innovative connections between social network analysis and data-reduction and display techniques, especially multidimensional scaling, and presented some of the earliest analyses of two-mode (actor-and-event) social network data. In recognition of these and his various other contributions to the field, Laumann was chosen as the keynote speaker at the first European social networks conference in Groningen, Netherlands in 1989, and at the Annual Sunbelt Conference in Vancouver, Canada, in 2006.

=== Sociology of sexuality ===
In the wake of the HIV/AIDS epidemic in the mid-1980s, Laumann began to study the role of sexual behavior and social networks in the spread of the disease. Laumann and several colleagues - including Robert T. Michael, John Gagnon, Stuart Michaels, and Martina Morris - won a competition, first conceived by the NICHD in July 1987, to undertake a national survey of individuals' sexual practices and the social and sexual networks in which they occur. In 1989, Science magazine published a story about the upcoming study, which was still under review at the Office of Management and Budget. The story quickly gained national media attention, and Laumann and colleagues found themselves facing serious opposition from national politicians such as William E. Dannemeyer and Jesse Helms. Despite the support of other politicians, such as Daniel Patrick Moynihan and American Psychological Association lobbyist William A. Bailey, the project eventually was blocked by an act of Congress in 1991, which diverted the funds for the project to a "say no to sex" campaign. Laumann and his colleagues then turned to private funders, including the Robert Wood Johnson Foundation, the Kaiser Family Foundation, the Ford Foundation, the Rockefeller Foundation, and the MacArthur Foundation, which together funded the resulting National Health and Social Life Survey. Results of this study were published in 1994 in two books - a scholarly book, The Social Organization of Sexuality, and a more accessible companion book, Sex in America. Their findings had a major impact on science and in broader society, making the cover of Time magazine and covered in hundreds of media outlets throughout the world. A key finding from this study was that Americans are fairly conservative in their sex practices. In retrospect, Laumann remarked: "Only at Chicago could we have so thoroughly managed to take the fun out of sex." One of the team's primary conclusions was that, due to the social structuring of sexual contact, there was little chance of an AIDS epidemic within the heterosexual community - a scientific conclusion that challenged then-widespread, politically fueled rhetoric about the dangers of sex.

Laumann would also use the NHSLS data to write what would eventually become the most highly cited scientific study of sexual dysfunction written in any discipline - a paper published in 1999 in the Journal of the American Medical Association that documented the surprisingly widespread prevalence of sexual dysfunction in the U.S. Because he was recognized as one of the foremost experts in sexual behavior, sexual problems, and their public health implications, Laumann was brought on as a consultant by Pfizer in the mid-late 1990s and became instrumental in establishing the public interest in Viagra just prior to its release.

Laumann is also a critic of the two Kinsey Reports and has noted that they both focused on the biology of sex and lacked psychological and clinical information and analysis.

== Honors ==
Laumann has been a member of Phi Beta Kappa since 1959, was a Ford Foundation fellow in the behavioral sciences, is an affiliated scholar of the American Bar Foundation, and has won a number of other scholarly distinctions, including election as fellow of the American Association for the Advancement of Science and membership in the American Academy of Arts & Sciences. During his career, he has been a visiting professor or fellow at a number of universities around the world, including the University of Kent in Canterbury, England; Christian-Albrechts-Universitat in Kiel, West Germany; the London School of Economics; and Yonsei University in Seoul, South Korea.

== Publications (books) ==
- 1966, Prestige and Association in an Urban Community. New York: Bobbs-Merrill.
- 1970, The Logic of Social Hierarchies, with Paul Siegel and Robert W. Hodge. Chicago: Markham.
- 1973, Bonds of Pluralism: The Form and Substance of Urban Social Networks. New York: Wiley Interscience.
- 1976, Networks of Collective Action. A Perspective on Community Influence Systems, with Franz Urban Pappi. New York: Academic Press.
- 1982, Chicago Lawyers: The Social Structure of the Bar, with John P. Heinz. New York: Russell Sage Foundation/American Bar Foundation.
- 1987, The Organizational State: Social Choice in National Policy Domains, with David Knoke. Madison: University of Wisconsin Press.
- 1993, The Hollow Core: Private Interests in National Policy Making, with John P. Heinz, Robert Nelson, and Robert Salisbury. Cambridge: Harvard University Press.
- 1994, The Social Organization of Sexuality, with John Gagnon, Robert T. Michael, and Stuart Michaels. University of Chicago Press.
- 1994, Sex in America, with John H. Gagnon, Robert T. Michael, and Gina Kolata. New York: Little, Brown.
- 2001, Sex, Love and Health: Private Choices and Public Policies, with Robert T. Michael. University of Chicago Press.
- 2004, The Sexual Organization of the City, with Stephen Ellingson, Jenna Mahay, Anthony Paik, and Yoosik Youm. University of Chicago Press.
- 2005, Urban Lawyers: The New Social Structure of the Bar, with John P. Heinz, Robert L. Nelson, and Rebecca L. Sandefur. University of Chicago Press.
