= Joseph Galaskiewicz =

American sociologist

Joseph Galaskiewicz (born 24 February 1949) is an American sociologist and Professor of Sociology at the University of Arizona, known for his work on interorganizational relations and social network analysis.

== Biography ==
Born in Chicago, Galaskiewicz obtained his BA in sociology at the Loyola University Chicago in 1971. He continued his studies at the University of Chicago, where he obtained his MA in sociology in 1973 advised by Morris Janowitz, and his PhD in sociology in 1976 under supervision of Edward O. Laumann.

Galaskiewicz started his academic career as lecturer of sociology in 1973 at the Loyola University, and became Instructor of Sociology in 1975. In 1976, he became assistant professor of sociology at the University of Minnesota, Associate Professor of Sociology in 1980 and Professor of Sociology from 1986 to 2001. From 1989 to 2001, Galaskiewicz was also Professor of Strategic Management and Organization at the university's Curtis L. Carlson School of Management. In 2001, Galaskiewicz moved to the University of Arizona, where he is appointed Professor of Sociology in the School of Sociology and has a courtesy appointment in the School of Government and Public Policy. In 2018 he was the Founding Director of the Certificate Program in Computational Social Science in the College of Social and Behavioral Science at the University of Arizona. Over the years, he has been visiting professor at the Nankai University, Tianjin in 1988 and 2014; at Harvard University in 1998; and at Tilburg University in 2005.

Galaskiewicz was Director of Graduate Studies for many years at Minnesota, and was Chair of the Faculty, School of Sociology at the University of Arizona in 2003–04, 2007–08, and 2015–16. The Public and Nonprofit Division of the Academy of Management awarded him the Best Book Award for 1999 (with Bielefeld) the Best Article Published in 2004 Award (with Chaves and Stephens,) and Best Article Published in 2006 Award (with Bielefeld and Dowell). In 2014, Galaskiewicz won the Award for Distinguished Achievement and Leadership in Nonprofit and Voluntary Action Research awarded by the Association for Research on Nonprofit Organizations and Voluntary Action' He was also co-winner of the 2016-17 Graduate College Teaching and Mentoring Award University of Arizona.

== Work ==
=== Interorganizational relations ===
In the 1985 article "Interorganizational Relations" in the Annual Review of Sociology, Galaskiewicz outlined the field of study on interorganizational relations. He identified three fields:

- Resource procurement and allocation
- Political advocacy, and
- Organizational legitimation.

In the literature on interorganizational relations on resource procurement and allocation, Galaskiewicz further explained "analysts have focused on power dependency and the problems of overcoming environmental uncertainty. In studying interorganizational Relations within arenas of political advocacy, students have paid special attention to coalition formation and efforts at collective action. In studying interorganizational relations within arenas of organizational legitimation, analysts have examined organizational efforts at identifying with highly legitimate community and/or societal symbols."

=== Social network analysis ===
In their 1986 "Advances in social network analysis," Galaskiewicz and Stanley Wasserman address:

... the issue of how effectively to apply the latest developments in social network analysis to behavioural and social science disciplines. Topics examined include: ways to specify the network contents to be studied; how to select the method for representing network structures; how social network analysis has been used to study interorganizational relations via the resource dependence model; how to use a contact matrix for studying the spread of disease in epidemiology; and how cohesion and structural equivalence network theories relate to studying social influence. The book also offers some statistical models for social support networks.

== Selected publications ==
Books:

- Galaskiewicz, Joseph. Exchange networks and community politics. Sage Publications, 1979.
- Galaskiewicz, Joseph. Social organization of an urban grants economy. Academic Press, 1985.
- Wasserman, Stanley, and Joseph Galaskiewicz, eds. Advances in social network analysis: Research in the social and behavioral sciences. Vol. 171. Sage Publications, 1994.
- Galaskiewicz, Joseph, and Wolfgang Bielefeld. Nonprofits in an age of uncertainty. Aldine de Gruyter, 1998.

Articles, a selection:

- Laumann, Edward O., Joseph Galaskiewicz, and Peter V. Marsden. "Community structure as interorganizational linkages." Annual Review of Sociology (1978): 455–484.
- Galaskiewicz, Joseph. "Interorganizational relations." Annual Review of Sociology (1985): 281–304.
- Galaskiewicz, Joseph, and Stanley Wasserman. "Mimetic processes within an interorganizational field: An empirical test." Administrative science quarterly (1989): 454–479.
- Brass, Daniel J., Galaskiewicz, J., Greve, H. R., & Tsai, W. (2004). "Taking stock of networks and organizations: A multilevel perspective." Academy of management journal, 47(6), 795–817.
