= Nora Cate Schaeffer =

American sociologist and statistician

Nora Cate Schaeffer is an American sociologist and survey statistician. She is Sewell Bascom Professor of Sociology, emerita, and was director of the Survey Center at the University of Wisconsin–Madison, and president of the American Association for Public Opinion Research.

== Education and career ==
Schaeffer graduated in 1971 from Washington University in St. Louis with a bachelor's degree in anthropology. She earned a master's degree in urban studies from the University of Chicago in 1974, with a master's thesis on Islam and the City: A Research Ideology Reassessed supervised by geographer Paul Wheatley. She returned to the University of Chicago for doctoral studies, completing a Ph.D. in sociology there in 1984. Her dissertation, Distress in Major Adult Roles and Depression among White Men and Women, was supervised by Edward O. Laumann.

In the 1970s and early 1980s, Schaeffer worked at the National Opinion Research Center and the Center for Policy Research. After completing her doctorate, she joined the University of Wisconsin–Madison as an assistant professor in 1984. She became director of the Survey Center in 2003 and Sewell Bascom Professor in 2008.

In 2018 she was elected president of the American Association for Public Opinion Research for 2019–2020.

== Recognition ==
In 2010, Schaeffer became a Fellow of the American Statistical Association. She also became a fellow of the Midwest Association for Public Opinion Research in 2015.
