= High School and Beyond =

Logo

High School and Beyond (HS&B) is a longitudinal study of a nationally representative sample of people who were high school sophomores and seniors in 1980. The study was originally funded by the United States Department of Education's National Center for Education Statistics (NCES) as a part of their Secondary Longitudinal Studies Program. NORC at the University of Chicago, then known as the National Opinion Research Center, developed the sample design and performed the data collection for the study. The study surveyed students from over 1,000 public and private high schools on their cognitive and non-cognitive skills, high school experiences, work experiences, and future plans. Baseline surveys were administered in 1980, with follow-up surveys in 1982, 1984, 1986, 1992 (sophomores), 2014 (sophomores), and 2015 (seniors).

An additional follow-up study entered the field in 2021. Researchers at the University of Minnesota, the University of Wisconsin, the University of Texas at Austin, and Columbia University were working in collaboration with NORC to continue the project (with the endorsement of NCES). In 2019, the National Institute on Aging (Grant R01 AG058719) and the Alzheimer's Association (Grant SG-20-717567) awarded grants to re-contact the members of the original 1980 sophomore and senior classes.

== Historical context ==
The HS&B was designed and collected with funding from the U.S. Department of Education, National Center for Education Statistics (NCES), as part of their National Education Longitudinal Studies program to document the "educational, vocational, and personal development of young people… following them over time as they begin to take on adult roles and responsibilities". NORC at the University of Chicago collected the surveys. Noted sociologist James Samuel Coleman led the design team for the initial study. His work has had "a far-reaching impact on government education policy". In his writings on Coleman, Peter Marsden notes that "Coleman made influential contributions that range across the sociology of education, policy research, mathematical sociology, network/structural analysis, and sociological theory" and "ranks among the most influential sociologists of the twentieth century."

HS&B respondents occupy an important position at the end of the Baby Boom. They are the first post-Civil Rights cohort; they are the first cohort in which women's educational attainments exceeded those of men; they are the first in recent history in which it was normative for women to experience uninterrupted labor force participation; and they are among the first cohorts to confront the insecurity and loss of the generous pensions and affordable health insurance they experienced and expected when they began their careers. The HS&B cohort is more racially and ethnically diverse than earlier contemporary cohorts, in part because it was the first to come of age after the Immigration and Nationality Act of 1965 (the Hart-Cellar Act).

== Study design ==
=== Base year surveys ===
HS&B began in 1980 as a nationally representative sample of 30,030 sophomores and 28,240 seniors in 1,015 public and private high schools in the United States. From the initial sample of 58,270 public and private high school students, 14,825 sophomores and 11,995 seniors were selected to be re-interviewed over their early adult years. Each school contained a representative sample of 36 sophomores and 36 seniors, making possible inferences about each school and its student body. The student questionnaires in 1980 gathered important information about educational experiences, cognitive skills (measured by standardized multiple-choice assessments of reading, math, science and social studies achievement) and non-cognitive skills (e.g., self-esteem, self-efficacy, emotional distress, social activities, academic effort, reports from four teachers about the students’ educational, behavioral, and social characteristics), as well as peers, employment activities, educational and occupational plans and aspirations, and family background (e.g., parental education, family composition, siblings, parenting practices and parents’ educational and occupational expectations for their children).

=== Follow-up surveys ===
The sample members were re-surveyed in 1982, 1984, and 1986. The 1980 sophomores were also surveyed in 1992 and 2013-2014. The 1980 seniors were surveyed again in 2015. All follow-ups conducted in the 1980s and 1992 gathered information about cohort members' educational, employment, and family activities and transitions. The 1982 re-interview of sophomores featured a second round of cognitive tests and gathered secondary school transcripts, and the 1986 and 1992 surveys gathered post-secondary transcripts. Post-secondary transcripts were obtained for seniors in 1984 and 1986. The newest round of data collection was to begin in 2021, surveying the 1980 sophomores and seniors. The follow-up was designed to learn more about the 1980 cohort as they aged.

== Key findings ==
A wealth of information has been generated from the data gathered by the HS&B study. The National Center for Education Statistics (NCES) issued numerous reports as well as other publications generated from the study. Many of these reports address key education policy issues and are available to the public from the NCES website.

Researchers have used the HS&B data to write many journal articles (over 400), books, dissertations (over 250), and other reports (over 200) in a number of subject areas, including sociology, management, business, education, economics, political science, planning development, family studies, urban studies, social work, public administration, health care and health policy, and others.

In the area of education, HS&B data have been used for studies related to:

- the roles that schools play in the educational outcomes of students in general (Raudenbush et al., 1991; Lee and Bryk, 1989; Gamoran, 1987).
- the roles that schools play in the development of students’ noncognitive skills (Bryk, Lee and Holland, 1993; Coleman and Hoffer, 1987).
- the causes and effects of dropping out (McCaul et al., 1992; McNeal Jr., 1997; Pittman, 1991).
- the racial issues in regards to educational equity and educational outcomes (Taeuber and James,1982; Taeuber and James, 1983; Lucas, 2001; Madhere, 1997; Morgan, 1996; Rivkin, 1995).
- the gender related issues in regards to educational equity and educational outcomes (Riegle-Crumb et al., 2012; Marsh, 1989).
- the effects of extracurricular activities and work outside of school on academic performance (Marsh, 1991; Marsh, 1992; Marsh and Kleitman, 2005).
- the effects of self-esteem and self-concept on academic achievement (Mahaffy, 2004; Marsh, 1990a; Bekhuis, 1994).
- the effects of family structure, parental involvement, and related variables on children's school achievement (Astone and McLanahan, 1991; Marsh, 1990b; Milne et al., 1986; Astone and McLanan, 1993; Zimiles and Lee, 1991).

In the area of employment, HS&B data have been used for studies related to:

- the importance of social capital in the creation of human capital (Coleman, 1988).
- the effects of cognitive skills in relation to wages and other labor market outcomes (Murnane, Willett, and Levy, 1995; Murnane, Willett, and Tyler, 2000).
- the effects of noncognitive factors on to wages and other labor market outcomes (Deluca and Rosenbaum, 2001; Rosenbaum, 2001).
- the effects of schools on earnings and labor market outcomes (Eide, Showalter, and Sims, 2002).

In recent years, HS&B data has been used for studies related to:

- the relationship between high school mathematics coursework and mid-life health outcomes and disparities (Carroll et al. 2017).
- the effects of taking STEM related courses in high school on later life occupational outcomes (Black et al. 2021).
- the effects of not meeting occupational expectations on early mortality via “deaths of despair” (Muller et al. 2020).
- the importance of the source of mortality information and disparities among sources (Warren et al. 2017).
- the effects of educational attainment and inequality on noncognitive skills (Smith et al. 2019).

HS&B data have been used for research in areas outside of education and employment, such as alcohol use (Martin and Pritchard, 1991), family studies (O'Hare, 1991; Goldscheider and Goldscheider, 1989; Goldscheider and Goldscheider, 1991; Goldscheider and Goldscheider, 1993), obesity (Faith et al., 1998), and teenage pregnancy (Hanson, Myers and Ginsburg, 1987; Parnell, Swicegood and Stevens, 1994).

Findings from the HS&B study have helped to inform public policy debates about workforce training and financial aid for college, among other things. Information from the study has helped scientists and lawmakers understand what shapes people's lives between high school and early adulthood. Lawmakers have used findings using the HS&B data to design national education policies, such as the expansion of the States Scholars Program in 2005.

== Current activity ==
In 2019, researchers at the University of Texas at Austin, University of Wisconsin, the [University of Minnesota, Columbia University, and NORC at the University of Chicago began planning for a new 2021 follow-up of the HS&B sample members. The follow-up was funded by the National Institute on Aging and the Alzheimer's Association, and intended to follow up with approximately 25,500 sample members of the 1980 sophomore and senior classes from the original HS&B study sponsored by NCES.

The 2021 follow-up surveys were to assess sample members' cognitive skills as they approach age 60, and were designed to understand the connections between social relationships, education, and health. The survey also collected updated information about sample members' work experiences, health, and family roles at midlife. This information would be used to understand how sample members had fared since they were last contacted. Study respondents would also have the opportunity to participate in a home health visit to complete health measurements in their own home, like blood pressure, height and weight. Sample members would be asked to provide blood and saliva samples. This information would be used to better understand how people’s genes, biology, and life experiences intersect to influence health and cognitive well-being.

The resulting research would focus on understanding how opportunities and experiences of adolescents and young adults, as well as characteristics of their high schools and post-secondary institutions, shape sample members' lives as they age and approach their retirement years.

== Selected bibliography of research generated from HS&B data ==
- Astone, Nan Marie, and Sara S. McLanahan. 1991. "Family Structure, Parental Practices and High School Completion." American Sociological Review, 56(3), 309-20.
- Astone, Nan Marie, and Sara S. McLanahan. 1994. "Family Structure, Residential Mobility, and School Dropout: A Research Note." Demography 31(4):575-84.
- Austin, Megan. 2019. “Measuring High School Curricular Intensity over Three Decades.” Sociology of Education.
- Battey, Dan. 2013. "Access to mathematics:“A possessive investment in whiteness”." Curriculum Inquiry 43(3): 332-359.
- Bekhuis, Tanja C. H. M. 1994. "The Self-Esteem of Adolescents in American Public High Schools: A Multilevel Analysis of Individual Differences." Personality and Individual Differences 16(4):579-88.
- Bielby, Rob, Julie Posselt, Ozan Jaquette, and Michael Bastedo. 2014. “Why Are Women Underrepresented in Elite Colleges and Universities? A Non-Linear Decomposition Analysis.” Research in Higher Education 55 (8): 735–760.
- Black, Sandra E., Chandra Muller, Alexandra Spitz-Oener, Ziwei He, Koit Hung and John Robert Warren. Forthcoming. "The importance of STEM: High school knowledge, skills and occupations in an era of growing inequality." Research Policy.
- Bound, John; Brad Hershbein and Bridget Terry Long. 2009. "Playing the Admissions Game: Student Reactions to Increasing College Competition," NBER Working Paper No. 15272. Cambridge, MA: National Bureau of Economic Statistics,
- Bryk, Anthony S., Valerie E. Lee and Peter B. Holland. 1993. Catholic Schools and the Common Good. Cambridge, MA: Harvard University Press.
- Bryk, Anthony S. and Yeow Meng Thum. 1989. "The Effects of High School Organization on Dropping Out: An Exploratory Investigation." American Educational Research Journal, 26(3), 353-83.
- Cahalan, Margaret, Laura W. Perna, Mika Yamashita, J. Wright-Kim, and N. Jiang. 2019. "Indicators of Higher Education Equity in the United States: 2019 Historical Trend Report." Pell Institute for the Study of Opportunity in Higher Education.
- Carroll, Jamie M., Chandra Muller, Eric Grodsky, and John Robert Warren. 2017. “Tracking Health Inequalities from High School to Midlife.” Social Forces, 96(2): 591–628. doi: 10.1093/sf/sox065.
- Coleman, James S., Thomas Hoffer, and Sally Kilgore (1981). Public and Private Schools. Washington, D.C.: U.S. Department of Education. National Center for Educational Statistics.
- Coleman, James S. Thomas Hoffer, and Sally Kilgore. 1982. High School Achievement: Public, Catholic, and Private Schools Compared. New York: Basic Books.
- Coleman, James S. and Thomas Hoffer. 1987. Public and Private High Schools: The Impact of Communities. New York: Basic Books.
- Coleman, James S. 1988. "Social Capital in the Creation of Human Capital." American Journal of Sociology, 94(Supplement), S95-S120.
- Deluca, Stefanie, and James E. Rosenbaum. 2001. "Individual Agency and the Life Course: Do Low-SES Students Get Less Long-term Payoff for Their School Efforts?" Sociological Focus 34(4):357-76.
- DiPrete, Thomas A., Chandra Muller, and Nora Shaeffer. 1981. Discipline and Order in American High Schools. Washington, D.C.: U.S. Department of Education. National Center for Education Statistics.
- Domina, Thurston, and Joshua Saldana. 2012. “Does Raising the Bar Level the Playing Field?: Mathematics Curricular Intensification and Inequality in American High Schools, 1982–2004.” American Educational Research Journal 49 (4): 685-708.
- Eide, Eric R., Mark H. Showalter, and David P. Sims. 2002. "The Effects of Secondary School Quality on the Distribution of Earnings." Contemporary Economic Policy 20(2):160-70.
- Faith, M. S., E. Manibay, M. Kravitz, J. Griffith, and D. B. Allison. 1998. "Relative Body Weight and Self-esteem among African Americans in Four Nationally Representative Samples." Obesity Research 6(6):430-7.
- Flashman, Jennifer. 2013. “A Cohort Perspective on Gender Gaps in College Attendance and Completion.” Research in Higher Education 54(5):545–70.
- Gamoran, Adam. 1987. "The Stratification of High School Learning Opportunities." Sociology of Education 60(3):135-55.
- Goldscheider, Frances K., and Calvin Goldscheider. 1989. "Family Structure and Conflict: Nest-leaving Expectations of Young Adults and Their Parents." Journal of Marriage & Family 51(1):87-97.
- Goldscheider, Frances K., and Calvin Goldscheider. 1991. "The Intergenerational Flow of Income: Family Structure and the Status of Black Americans." {Goldscheider, 1993 #1158} 53(2):499-508.
- Goldscheider, Frances K., and Calvin Goldscheider. 1993. "Whose Nest? A Two-Generational View of Leaving Home During the 1980s." Journal of Marriage & Family 55(4):851-62.
- Hanson, Sandra L., David E. Myers, and Alan L. Ginsburg. 1987. "The Role of Responsibility and Knowledge in Reducing Teenage Out-of-Wedlock Childbearing." Journal of Marriage & Family 49(2):241.
- Heckman, James J and Paul A. LaFontaine. 2007. "The American High School Graduation Rate: Trends and Levels," NBER Working Paper No. 13670. Cambridge, MA: National Bureau of Economic Research,
- Heckman, James J. and Paul A. LaFontaine. 2010. "The American High School Graduate Rate: Trends and Levels." The Review of Economics and Statistics, 92(2), 244-62.
- Herrmann, Mariesa, and Cecilia Machado. 2012. "Patterns of selection in labor market participation." In 11th IZA/SOLE Transatlantic Meeting of Labor Economists.
- Ingels, Steven J., Elizabeth Glennie, Erich Lauff, John G. Wirt, National Center for Education Statistics (ED), and RTI International. 2012. “Trends among Young Adults over Three Decades, 1974-2006. NCES 2012-345.” National Center for Education Statistic, July.
- Keith, Timothy Z., Sheila M. Pottebaum, and Steve Eberhart. 1986. "Effects of Self-concept and Locus of Control on Academic Achievement: A Large-sample Path Analysis." Journal of Psychoeducational Assessment 4(1):61-72.
- Lee, Valerie E. and Anthony S. Bryk. 1989. "A Multilevel Model of the Social Distribution of High School Achievement." Sociology of Education, 62(3):172-92.
- Lucas, Samuel R. 2001. "Effectively Maintained Inequality: Education Transitions, Track Mobility, and Social Background Effects." American Journal of Sociology, 106(6), 1642-90.
- Lucas, Samuel R. Good Aaron D. 2001. "Race, Class, and Tournament Track Mobility." Sociology of Education 74(2):139-56.
- Madhere, Serge. 1997. "Convergence and Divergence in the Process of Academic Development for Black, White, and Hispanic High School Students." Journal of Education for Students Placed at Risk 2(2):137-60.
- Mahaffy, Kimberly A. 2004. "Girls' Low Self-Esteem: How Is It Related to Later Socioeconomic Achievements?" Gender and Society 18(3):309-27.
- Marsh, Herbert W. 1989. "Sex Differences in the Development of Verbal and Mathematics Constructs: The High School and Beyond Study." American Educational Research Journal 26(2):191-225.
- Marsh, Herbert W. 1990a. "Influences of Internal and External Frames of Reference on the Formation of Math and English Self-Concepts." Journal of Educational Psychology, 82(1):107-16.
- Marsh, Herbert W. 1990b. "Two-Parent, Stepparent, and Single-Parent Families: Changes in Achievement, Attitudes, and Behaviors during the Last Two Years of High School." Journal of Educational Psychology 82(2):327-40.
- Marsh, Herbert W. 1991. "Employment during High School: Character Building or a Subversion of Academic Goals?" Sociology of Education 64(3):172-89.
- Marsh, Herbert W. 1992. "Extracurricular Activities: Beneficial Extension of the Traditional Curriculum or Subversion of Academic Goals." Journal of Educational Psychology 84(4):553.
- Marsh, Herbert W., and Sabina Kleitman. 2005. "Consequences of Employment during High School: Character Building, Subversion of Academic Goals, or a Threshold?" American Educational Research Journal 42(2):331-69.
- Martin, M. J., and M. E. Pritchard. 1991. "Factors Associated with Alcohol Use in Later Adolescence." Journal of Studies on Alcohol 52(1):5-9.
- McCaul, Edward J., and et al. 1992. "Consequences of Dropping Out of School: Findings from High School and Beyond." Journal of Educational Research 85(4):198-207.
- McNeal Jr, Ralph B. 1997. "High School Dropouts: A Closer Examination of School Effects." Social Science Quarterly (University of Texas Press) 78(1):209-22.
- Milne, Ann M., David E. Myers, Alvin S. Rosenthal, and Alan Ginsburg. 1986. "Single Parents, Working Mothers, and the Educational Achievement of School Children." Sociology of Education 59(3):125-39.
- Morgan, Stephen L. 1996. "Trends in Black-White Differences in Educational Expectations: 1980-92." Sociology of Education 69(4):308-19.
- Muller Chandra L. 2015. Measuring school contexts. AERA open. 1(4).
- Muller, Chandra, Alicia Duncombe, Jamie M. Carroll, Anna S. Mueller, John Robert Warren, and Eric Grodsky. 2020. "Association of Job Expectations Among High Schoolers and Suicide During Adulthood." JAMA Nnetwork Oopen 3(12):e2027958
- Murnane, Richard J. 1984. "A Review Essay-Comparisons of Public and Private Schools: Lessons from the Uproar." The Journal of Human Resources 19:263-277.
- Murnane, Richard J., John B. Willett, and Frank Levy. 1995. "The Growing Importance of Cognitive Skills in Wage Determination." Review of Economics and Statistics 77:251-266.
- Murnane, Richard J., John B. Willett, and John H. Tyler. 2000. "Who Benefits from Obtaining a GED? Evidence from High School and Beyond." Review of Economics and Statistics 82:23-37.
- Nielsen, François and Steven J. Lerner. 1986. "Language Skills and School Achievement of Bilingual Hispanics." Social Science Research, 15(3), 209-40.
- Nielsen, Francois. 1986. "Hispanics in High School and Beyond," M. A. Olivas, Latino College Students. New York: Teachers College Press, 71-103.
- Noah, Lewin-Epstein. 1981. Youth Employment During High School. Washington, DC. U.S. Department of Education. National Center for Education Statistics.
- O'Hare, W. P. 1991. "Gonna Get Married: Family Formation in Rural Areas." Population Today 19(2):6-7, 9.
- Parnell, Allan M., Gray Swicegood, and Gillian Stevens. 1994. "Nonmarital Pregnancies and Marriage in the United States." Social Forces 73(1):263-87.
- Pattison, Evangeleen, Eric Grodsky, and Chandra Muller. 2013. “Is the Sky Falling? Grade Inflation and the Signaling Power of Grades.” Educational Researcher 42 (5): 259-265.
- Phillips, Meredith. 2000. "Understanding ethnic differences in academic achievement: Empirical lessons from national data." Pp. 103-132 in Analytic issues in the assessment of student achievement : National Center for Education Statistics. Washington DC: U.S. Department of Education.
- Pittman, Robert B. 1991. "Social Factors, Enrollment in Vocational/Technical Courses, and High School Dropout Rates." Journal of Educational Research 84(5):288-95.
- Posselt, Julie Renee, Ozan Jaquette, Rob Bielby, and Michael N. Bastedo. 2012. "Access without equity: Longitudinal analyses of institutional stratification by race and ethnicity, 1972–2004." American Educational Research Journal 49(6)1074-1111.
- Raudenbush, Stephen W., and et al. 1991. "A Multilevel, Multivariate Model for Studying School Climate with Estimation via the EM Algorithm and Application to U.S. High-School Data." Journal of Educational Statistics 16(4):295-330.
- Riegle-Crumb, Catherine, Barbara King, Eric Grodsky, and Chandra Muller. 2012. "The More Things Change, the More They Stay the Same? Prior Achievement Fails to Explain Gender Inequality in Entry into STEM College Majors Over Time." American Educational Research Journal 49(6):1048-73.
- Rivkin, Steven G. 1995. "Black/White Differences in Schooling and Employment." Journal of Human Resources 30(4):826-52.
- Rosenbaum, James. 2001. Chapter 8 “Are Noncognitive Behaviors in School Related to Later Life Outcomes?” Beyond College for All: Career Paths for the Forgotten Half. New York, NY: Russell Sage.
- Shifrer, Dara, Jennifer Pearson, Chandra Muller, and Lindsey Wilkinson. 2015. “College-Going Benefits of High School Sports Participation: Race and Gender Differences Over Three Decades.” Youth & Society 47 (3): 295-318.
- Smith, Christian Michael, Eric Grodsky and John Robert Warren. 2019. "Late-Stage Educational Inequality: Can Selection on Academic and Noncognitive Skills Explain Waning Social Background Effects?". Research in Social Stratification and Mobility (RSSM). 63:100424. doi: 10.1016/j.rssm.2019.100424.
- Snellman, Kaisa, Jennifer M. Silva, Carl B. Frederick, and Robert D. Putnam. 2015. “The Engagement Gap: Social Mobility and Extracurricular Participation among American Youth.” Annals of the American Academy of Political & Social Science 657 (1): 194-204.
- Taeuber, Karl E. and David R. James. 1982. "Racial Segregation among Public and Private Schools." Sociology of Education 55(2-3):133-143.
- Taeuber, Karl E. and David R. James. 1983. "Racial Segregation among Public and Private Schools: A Response." Sociology of Education 56(4):204-207
- Tchuente, Guy. 2019. "High school human capital portfolio and college outcomes." Journal of Human Capital 10(3):267-302.
- Thomas, M. Kathleen. 2009. "The Impact of Education Histories on the Decision to Become Self-Employed: A Study of Young, Aspiring, Minority Business Owners." Small Business Economics, 33(4), 455-66.
- Warren, John Robert, Carolina Milesi, Karen Grigorian, Melissa Humphries, Chandra Muller, and Eric Grodsky. 2017. "Do Inferences about Mortality Rates and Disparities Vary by Source of Mortality Information?" Annals of Epidemiology 27(2):121-27.
- Warren, John Robert, Chandra Muller, Robert A. Hummer, Eric Grodsky, and Melissa Humphries. 2020. "Which Aspects of Education Matter for Early Adult Mortality? Evidence from the High School and Beyond Cohort " Socius 6:2378023120918082.
- Zimiles, Herbert, and Valerie E. Lee. 1991. "Adolescent family structure and educational progress. Developmental Psychology, 27(2), 314–320.
