= Henrich R. Greve =

Norwegian organizational theorist

- Born: 1966 (age 59–60); Stavanger, Norway
- Education: Norwegian School of Economics; Stanford University
- Known for: Heterogenous diffusion, Performance feedback
- Awards: Fellow, Academy of Management (2012)
- Scientific career
- Fields: Organizational theory, Strategy
- Workplaces: University of Tsukuba; Norwegian School of Management; INSEAD
- Thesis: Patterns of competition: The diffusion of strategy adoption and abandonment (1994)
- Doctoral advisor: James G. March

Henrich R. Greve (born 1 January 1966) is a Norwegian organizational theorist, Professor of Entrepreneurship and the Rudolf and Valeria Maag Chair in Entrepreneurship at INSEAD. He is the Academic Director of the Rudolf and Valeria Maag INSEAD Centre for Entrepreneurship. He was the editor of the Administrative Science Quarterly and has also held editorial positions in Organization Science and Academy of Management Journal.

== Career ==
Born in Stavanger, Norway, Greve received his Siviløkonom degree (B.A. in economics and business) from the Norwegian School of Economics in 1989. He continued to study in the United States at Stanford University, where in 1993, he received his MA in sociology. The next year, in 1994, he also received his PhD with a thesis entitled Patterns of Competition: The Diffusion of Adoption and Abandonment of Radio Broadcasting Strategies under supervision of James G. March.

Greve started his academic career at the University of Tsukuba in Japan in 1995 as assistant professor in the Institute of Policy and Planning Science, where in 1998 he became associate professor. In 2002, he moved back to Norway, where he was appointed as professor at the Norwegian School of Management. In 2007, he moved to INSEAD, where he became a chaired professor of entrepreneurship.

Greve's research interests are in the field of causes and consequences of strategic change in organizations, but he also studies organizational innovations, organizational founding and growth in young industries, and organizational network. His most recent research is on the use of language in organizations and society, and he has published a book on online conspiracy talk based on the COVID-19 conspiracy theories. He is also doing research on the effect of AI on organizations and the labor market.

== Publications ==
Greve has authored and co-authored numerous publications in his field of expertise. Selected books:

- Greve, Henrich R. (2003-06-26). Organizational Learning from Performance Feedback: A Behavioral Perspective on Innovation and Change (1 ed.). Cambridge University Press. doi:10.1017/cbo9780511615139. ISBN 978-0-521-81831-5.
- Greve, Henrich; Rowley, Tim; Shipilov, Andrew, eds. (2012-01-02). Network Advantage: How to Unlock Value from Your Alliances and Partnerships. Wiley. doi:10.1002/9781118561393. ISBN 978-1-118-56145-4.
- Audia, Pino G.; Greve, Henrich R. (2021-02-28). Organizational Learning from Performance Feedback: A Behavioral Perspective on Multiple Goals: A Multiple Goals Perspective. Cambridge University Press. doi:10.1017/9781108344289. ISBN 978-1-108-34428-9.
- Rao, Hayagreeva; Greve, Henrich R. (2026-05-22). Ctrl-Alt-Doubt: Decoding the Language of Online Conspiracy Talk. Oxford University Press. doi: 10.1093/9780197772324.001.0001. HTML: 9780197772287.

Selected articles:

- Barnett, William P., Henrich R. Greve, and Douglas Y. Park (1994). "An evolutionary model of organizational performance." Strategic Management Journal 15(S1), 11-28.
- Greve, Henrich R. (1998). "Performance, Aspirations and Risky Organizational Change." Administrative Science Quarterly. 43(March), 58-86.
- Davis, Gerald F., and Henrich R. Greve (1997). "Corporate elite networks and governance changes in the 1980s." American Journal of Sociology 103(1), 1-37.
- Greve, Henrich R. (2003). "A behavioral theory of R&D expenditures and innovations: Evidence from shipbuilding." Academy of Management Journal 46(6), 685-702.
- Brass, D. J., Galaskiewicz, J., Greve, H. R., & Tsai, W. (2004). "Taking stock of networks and organizations: A multilevel perspective ". Academy of Management Journal, 47(6), 795-817.
- Gavetti, Giovanni, Henrich R. Greve, Dan A. Levinthal, & Willie Ocasio (2012). "The Behavioral Theory of the Firm: Assessment and Prospects.". Academy of Management Annals, 6, 1-40.

== See also ==
- Organizational learning
- Organizational ecology
- Diffusion of innovations
