= Frederick Mosteller =

American statistician (1916–2006)

Charles Frederick Mosteller
- Born: December 24, 1916; Clarksburg, West Virginia, U.S.
- Died: July 23, 2006 (aged 89); Arlington, Virginia, U.S.
- Other name: Fred Mosteller
- Education: Carnegie Institute of Technology; Princeton University
- Known for: Statistics education
- Scientific career
- Fields: Statistician
- Workplaces: Harvard University
- Doctoral advisor: Samuel S. Wilks and John Tukey
- Doctoral students: Persi Diaconis; Stephen Fienberg; Stanley Wasserman; Ward Edwards

Charles Frederick Mosteller (December 24, 1916 – July 23, 2006) was an American mathematician, considered one of the most eminent statisticians of the 20th century. He was the founding chairman of Harvard's statistics department from 1957 to 1971, and served as the president of several professional bodies including the Psychometric Society, the American Statistical Association, the Institute of Mathematical Statistics, the American Association for the Advancement of Science, and the International Statistical Institute.

== Biographical details ==
Frederick Mosteller was born in Clarksburg, West Virginia, on December 24, 1916, to Helen Kelley Mosteller and William Roy Mosteller. His father was a highway builder. He was raised near Pittsburgh, Pennsylvania, and attended Carnegie Institute of Technology (now Carnegie Mellon University). He completed his ScM degree at Carnegie Tech in 1939, and enrolled at Princeton University in 1939 to work on a PhD with statistician Samuel S. Wilks.

In 1941 he married Virginia Gilroy, whom he met during college. They had two children: Bill (born 1947) and Gale (born 1953). They lived in Belmont, Massachusetts. and spent summers in West Falmouth, Massachusetts on Cape Cod.

Mosteller worked in Samuel Wilks's Statistical Research Group in New York city during World War II on statistical questions about airborne bombing. He received his PhD in mathematics from Princeton University in 1946.

He was hired by Harvard University's Department of Social Relations in 1946, where he received tenure in 1951 and served as acting chair from 1953 to 1954. He founded the Department of Statistics and served as its first chairman from 1957 to 1969, 1973, 1975 to 1977. He chaired the Department of Biostatistics at the Harvard School of Public Health from 1977 to 1981 and later the Department of Health Policy and Management in the 1980s. His four chairmanships have not been matched. He also taught courses at Harvard Law School and Harvard's Kennedy School of Government.

He worked with his mathematical assistant Cleo Youtz from the 1950s until his departure from Harvard in 2003, and had an administrative assistant. He was well known for being a good writer, insisting on doing up to fifteen drafts of a paper or book chapter before showing it to his colleagues and several additional drafts before submitting the paper to a journal.

Mosteller was an elected member of the American Academy of Arts and Sciences (1954), the American Philosophical Society (1961), and the United States National Academy of Sciences (1974). He retired from classroom teaching in 1987, but continued working and publishing at Harvard through 2003. On January 3, 2004, he moved to Arlington, Virginia, to be closer to his children.

== Contributions to statistics ==
Mosteller wrote over 50 books and over 350 papers, with over 200 coauthors. An avid fan of the Boston Red Sox, he conducted what was perhaps the first academic investigation of baseball, after the Red Sox lost the 1946 World Series. Some of his work involved research evaluation and synthesis, especially in medicine and public health.

With David Wallace Mosteller studied the attribution problem that asks who wrote each of the disputed Federalist Papers, James Madison or Alexander Hamilton. This analysis was carried out in order to demonstrate the power of Bayesian inference, and for that time was computationally intensive. It was featured in Time magazine on September 21, 1962.

== Contributions to statistics education ==
Mosteller used the didactic method, among other approaches to teaching. He cared greatly about the teaching of statistics. He was a mentor to many, and his positive attitudes toward teaching influenced his many students.

His friend Robert E. K. Rourke once gave Mosteller an idea for presenting new material in lectures. Rourke called it PGP Particular General Particular, meaning that a lecture should always be "specific, general, specific". The advice was, begin with a particular interesting example, continue with a general point, and end with a particular example illustrating the general point.

Prompted by a seminar by Derek Bok, in the last two or three minutes of the class Mosteller would ask the students to write down what was the muddiest point in the lecture and what they'd like to know more about. He rehearsed every lecture that he gave at least once, in the actual circumstances, for the timing of the lecture, and to avoid the temptation to speak quickly in order to fit in more material. Instead, he would cut out parts of the lecture.

Mosteller taught a class in probability and statistics as part of the educational television program, Continental Classroom - Mathematics, in 1960 and 1961, supported by the Ford Foundation and broadcast on NBC: 75,000 students took this class for credit at 320 colleges and universities around the country, and 1.2 million watched the lectures on television on 170 stations. The show received its impressively large audience despite being broadcast at 6:30 am. Monday, Wednesday, and Friday covered the statistical material, and Tuesday and Thursday were problem sessions.

=== Graduate students ===
Mosteller's graduate students included Janellen Huttenlocher, Persi Diaconis, Stephen Fienberg, Stanley Wasserman, Ralph D'Agostino, Sanford Weisberg and Ward Edwards.
