= Daniel J. Brass =

American organizational theorist (1948 - 2025)

Daniel Joseph (Dan) Brass (1948 - January 4, 2025) was an American organizational theorist and Professor of Innovation Management at the University of Kentucky, and Director of its LINKS Center for Social Network.

== Biography ==
Brass studied at the University of Illinois at Urbana–Champaign, where in 1969 he received his BA in Psychology, in 1975 his MA in Labor and Industrial Relations, and in 1979 his PhD in Business Administration and Management.

Brass started his academic career as Assistant Professor at The Pennsylvania State University in 1979. In 2000, he moved to the University of Kentucky, where he was appointed J. Henning Hilliard Professor of Innovation Management. He founded the LINKS Center for Social Network Analysis in 2006, and served as the Director of the LINKS Center and Chair of the Department of Management in the Gatton College of Business and Economics.

From 1995 to 2007 Brass was Associate Editor at the Administrative Science Quarterly. Brass also served on the editorial boards of many journals, such as Academy of Management Journal, Academy of Management Review, Administrative Science Quarterly, Journal of Applied Psychology, and Management and Organization Review.

His research interests "focus on the antecedents and consequences of social networks in organizations".

== Selected publications ==
Brass authored and co-authored numerous publications in his field of expertise. Books, a selection:

- Brass, D. J. & Borgatti, S. P. (2020). Social networks at work. New York: Routledge.

Articles, a selection:

- Brass, Daniel J. "Being in the right place: A structural analysis of individual influence in an organization." Administrative Science Quarterly (1984): 518–539.
- Brass, Daniel J. "Men's and women's networks: A study of interaction patterns and influence in an organization." Academy of Management Journal 28.2 (1985): 327–343.
- Burkhardt, Marlene E., and Daniel J. Brass. "Changing patterns or patterns of change: The effects of a change in technology on social network structure and power." Administrative science quarterly (1990): 104–127.
- Brass, D. J., Galaskiewicz, J., Greve, H. R., & Tsai, W. (2004). "Taking stock of networks and organizations: A multilevel perspective". Academy of management journal, 47(6), 795–817.
- Borgatti, S. P., Mehra, A., Brass, D. J., & Labianca, G. (2009). "Network analysis in the social sciences." Science, 323(5916), 892–895.
