= National Longitudinal Study of the High School Class of 1972 =

Long-term American study

- Conducted by the National Center for Education Statistics

Agency overview
- Formed: 1972
- Jurisdiction: United States
- Headquarters: Washington, D.C.
- Employees: ~19,000 students surveyed in 1,000+ schools
- Parent agency: National Center for Education Statistics; U.S. Department of Education
- Website: nces.ed.gov/surveys/nls72

The National Longitudinal Study of the High School Class of 1972 (NLS-72) was a comprehensive study conducted to track the educational, vocational, and personal development of high school seniors who graduated in 1972.

NLS-72 was implemented by the National Center for Education Statistics (NCES), a division of the U.S. Department of Education. It is the first in an ongoing series of longitudinal studies designed to offer policymakers and researchers data related to high school educational experiences in the United States.

NLS–72's design is a nationally representative, random sample of the three million American high school seniors enrolled in the spring of 1972. Students answered questions about their personal and family background, education and work experiences, plans for the future, attitudes, and opinions. School administrators and counsellors provided additional information about students and schools.

== Historical context ==
The idea for national longitudinal surveys of high school students emerged during a period of rapid change in American society. The Baby Boom (1945–1965) led to a surge in public school enrollment, coinciding with desegregation following Brown v. Board of Education (1954). The Cold War and the Soviet Union's 1957 launch of Sputnik fueled public anxiety over the perceived technological and educational gap between the U.S. and the Soviet Union, prompting the federal government to take on a greater role in providing high-quality education to American schoolchildren. President Lyndon B. Johnson's Great Society policies, including the Elementary and Secondary Education Act, sought to increase federal funding and evaluation of public schools. Social scientists were enlisted by the Department of Education to apply quantitative methods, a practice known as systems analysis, to guide policy making. This approach laid the foundation for evidence-based practices in policy analysis.

Systems analysis allowed policymakers to collect, compare, and analyze educational data, such as teacher retention and graduation rates, to inform decisions. The National Assessment of Educational Progress (NAEP), the first national assessment and report on the American school system, was introduced in 1964. This annual report provided aggregated snapshots of the U.S. education system and is still in use today. While valuable, the NAEP's static nature limited its ability to track changes over time and explore cause-and-effect relationships. Researchers advocated for longitudinal studies, which aimed to fill this gap.

== Development and purpose ==
The National Longitudinal Study of the High School Class of 1972 (NLS-72) was conceived in the early 1960s, during the height of systems analysis. Its goal was to understand the educational development of students and the factors influencing their education and career outcomes. Researchers sought data on school quality, course patterns, attendance, ambition, and post-graduation outcomes, including higher education, the workforce, and family life. Special attention was given to postsecondary trends, particularly in the context of the Civil Rights and Second-Wave Feminism movements, which saw increased attendance among women and students of color in higher education. The study also aimed to explore factors affecting postsecondary choices, including cost, access, and persistence.

== Study design ==
=== Base year surveys ===
Base-year data for NLS-72 was collected in Spring 1972, prior to high school graduation. Students were selected using a stratified, two-stage probability sample, in which schools were selected first, and in the second stage, seniors were randomly chosen from each school. The stratified, random sample originally included 1,200 schools from strata defined by characteristics like geographic region, school type, enrollment size, proximity to higher education institutions, racial and ethnic composition, community income, and urbanization level. Schools in low-income areas and those with high numbers of Black, Hispanic, and other racial minority students were sampled at twice the rate of other schools. These groups were oversampled because while they made up a smaller amount of the population, adequate data on their experiences was needed to study and address racial opportunity gaps. Within each school, eighteen senior students were randomly selected. Students who had dropped out, graduated early, or were in adult education classes were omitted.

Initial instruments included a Student Questionnaire, a Student Record Information Form (SRIF), a School Questionnaire, and a Counselor Questionnaire. The Student Questionnaire gathered information on personal and family backgrounds, education and work experiences, plans for the future, as well as attitudes, aspirations, and opinions. The questionnaire also included a cognitive test battery.

At the conclusion of the base-year survey, only 1,040 schools from the original sample, along with 26 backup schools, participated. At this point, several strata had no participating schools, and many only had one. To mitigate the effects of school nonresponse, a resurvey was conducted in the summer of 1973, prior to the first follow-up survey. The final NLS-72 sample comprised 23,450 former 1972 high school seniors and 1,340 schools.

=== Follow-up surveys ===
Follow-up surveys for the study were conducted in 1973, 1974, 1976, 1979, and 1986. These questionnaires collected information on sample members' marital status, children, educational attainment, military service, work history, attitudes and opinions related to self-esteem, goals, job satisfaction, and participation in community affairs.

During the fourth follow-up survey (1979), a subsample of sample members who had completed the Student Questionnaire and the Cognitive Test Battery in the base-year were retested on a subset of the same Cognitive Test Battery. Black sample members were oversampled to ensure an adequate number of Black NLS-72 sample members.

In 1986, the fifth follow-up survey involved an unequal probability subsample of 22,650 students who had participated in at least one of the previous five waves. This follow-up maintained the core features of the initial stratified, multistage design but differed by using unequal, secondary sampling to oversample policy-relevant groups and achieve cost-efficiency. Specific subgroups retained with certainty included Hispanic respondents, teachers and potential teachers, individuals with advanced degrees, and those who were widowed, separated, or never-married parents.

=== Teaching supplement ===
The teaching supplement was administered to follow-up respondents in 1986 who indicated on the main survey that they had teaching experience or training. The supplement assessed the experiences, qualifications, and perspectives of current and former teachers, both elementary and secondary. The supplement also gathered data on the qualifications of those who had completed an education degree and/or received certification but had not become teachers.

=== Postsecondary education transcript study ===
To study occupational and career outcomes, NCES requested official transcripts from all academic and vocational schools attended by NLS-72 sample members. High school transcripts were collected in 1973, and post-secondary transcripts in 1984.

== Key findings ==
There is a large bibliography of over 1,000 publications which use data from NLS-72. These publications cover varied topics including postsecondary education (issues of access, aid, persistence, aspirations), vocational and technical education, labor force participation, career development patterns, family and lifestyle activities, gender roles and attitudes, and survey methodology

Below are some of the most-cited articles in various topics using data from NLS-72.

=== Postsecondary education ===
- Researchers were able to publish preliminary findings on college degree attainment within only a few years of the base year study. In 1978, Peng and Fetters discussed variables associated with withdrawals from college. The authors found that female students were more likely to withdraw only in two-year colleges, white students were more likely to withdraw than Black students when other variables were controlled, and high school coursework, college grades, and educational aspiration account for most variance of withdrawal behavior.
- The nature and timing of NLS-72 provided a strong dataset to track outcomes of school desegregation, as discussed in Trent (1997). In this report, Trent was able to track noncognitive outcomes of school desegregation, including earnings and occupational attainment over time. Trent found that desegregated schooling offers a positive, statistically significant benefit for Black students over time.
- NLS-72 gave a unique perspective into the college selection process and its consequential effect on sample member earnings. In a 2002 paper, Dale and Krueger found that many students who attended more selective colleges earned about the same as students of seemingly comparable ability who attended less selective schools. Children from low-income families, however, benefitted more from attending selective colleges in their post-graduate earnings.
- Data from NLS-72 remains in use even 40 years after its last follow up. In 2023, Calkins et al. published a retrospective analysis of the effects of coeducation on women's college choices, as many women's colleges opened to men in the mid-20th century. The authors found that the share of women majoring in STEM fields decreased significantly in the ten years following the arrival of coeducational classes.

=== Teacher attrition ===
- In the years following the A Nation at Risk report (1983), attention and scrutiny were paid to many different aspects of the American public education system, including teacher retention. In 1988, an article by Barbara Heyns with Educational Researcher provided a study using information from the Teaching Supplement in the fourth NLS-72 follow-up. Heyns used it to dispel common myths about teacher retention that had developed since the release of A Nation at Risk.
- NLS-72's teaching supplement was also used by Choi and Chung in 2017. These researchers investigated the effects of public service motivation on turnover and teacher job satisfaction. In this study, the authors found that teachers who placed more importance on helping others were more satisfied with their jobs and less likely to leave; this trend covered both public and private schools.

=== Labor market developments ===
- In 1989, Sharp and Weidman addressed the popular concern that humanities majors have few job prospects in the American labor market. The researchers found that humanities majors often attended selective institutions and were far more likely to attend graduate school than their peers.
- Teachman and Call (1996) studied the relationship between military service of NLS-72 sample members and their educational, occupational, and income attainment following their service. They found that there is a relationship between military service and attainment that varies across race and historical context.

=== Family structure ===
- Demographic data from NLS-72 follow ups is often used in family structure research. Lillard, Brien, and Waite (1995) analyzed the effects of premarital cohabitation on marital dissolution and found that couples who lived together before marriage divorced at higher rates, contrary to the popular theory that cohabitation increases marital stability. According to the authors, "It may be that some couples use the information gained during cohabitation to avoid bad matches and legalize good ones. It also may be [...] that the experience of cohabiting changes people's views of marriage, making them less strongly committed to the institution and more willing to divorce."
- In a popular journal article from 1997, Weiss and Willis from NORC at the University of Chicago (formerly the National Opinion Research Center) reported on the role of income in marital dissolution. The researchers found that an unexpected increase in husband's earning capacity reduces divorce risk, while an unexpected increase in the wife's earning capacity raises chances of divorce.

== Impact on survey methodology ==
Because of the massive size and scope of the NLS-72 study and its follow-ups, the study has had substantive impact in social science research. Over the course of the five follow-ups, researchers were able to maintain high response rates and contact with sample members. Furthermore, NCES contracted partnerships with Research Triangle Institute (RTI) and Educational Testing Service (ETS) which led to extensive reports ensuring high quality data and outlining instructions for researcher use. Many of these reports are available on the NCES website.

NCES has continued the National Education Longitudinal Studies program with five additional longitudinal cohort studies, as of 2022. These studies are separated by roughly ten years each and were designed to also be nationally representative and comparable to the data measured and collected in NLS-72.

== The future of NLS-72 ==
In 2022, researchers at The University of Texas at Austin, the University of Wisconsin-Madison, the University of Minnesota, and Columbia University were awarded a grant from the National Institute on Aging (NIA) (Grant U01 AG078533) to repurpose the project and conduct additional follow-up studies of NLS-72. The 2025 follow-up of NLS-72 will assess sample members' cognitive skills in their early seventies to better understand the connections between education, life experiences, and health. The survey also collects updated information about sample members' work experiences, health, and exposure to discrimination. Study respondents will complete health measurements and be asked to provide blood and saliva samples. This information will be used to better understand how people's genes, biology, and life experiences intersect to influence health and cognitive well-being. The resulting research will focus on understanding how opportunities and experiences of adolescents and young adults, as well as characteristics of students' high schools, future aspirations, post-secondary institution attendance and attainment, occupational choices, socioeconomic disparities, familial experiences, and geography shape sample members' lives, earnings, well-being, and cognitive health as they age and approach the retirement years.
