= Nan Lin =

Chinese American sociologist

Nan Lin (born 1938 in Chongqing, China) is the Oscar L. Tang Family Professor of Sociology at Duke University. He is most notable for his research and writing on social networks and social capital.

== Biography ==
Lin received his undergraduate degree from Tunghai University, Taiwan, in 1960; his M.A. from Syracuse University in 1963; and his doctorate degree from Michigan State University in 1966. He entered the sociology department at the University at Albany, SUNY, in 1971, became a full professor there in 1976 and served as department chair from 1979 to 1982. In 1979, he established contacts with sociologists in the People's Republic of China and established an exchange program between Albany and Nankai University. He also helped organize the first U.S.-China doctoral program in sociology.

In 1990 he took a position as sociology professor at Duke University, where he also served as Director of the Asian-Pacific Studies Institute. A former Vice President of the American Sociological Association, he has also taught at Johns Hopkins University. He has worked in the United States, Central America, Haiti, China, and Taiwan.

== Research ==
Lin's research interest lies in social networks, social support and social capital. He has contributed theory, devised measurements and conducted empirical research in each of these areas. He has applied the theory and measurements to the study of social stratification and mobility, stress and coping, and individual, organization and community well-being.

Lin has employed both quantitative methods—such as large-scale national surveys, and surveys in organizations and communities—and qualitative methods, such as intensive long-term observations in villages, for example.

Having written about social networks since the early 1980s, Lin contributed to the economically oriented branch of the literature on social capital defined by Mark Granovetter and James Coleman, seeking to establish a research paradigm which integrates theory with empirical testing. His definition of social capital as access to resources through network ties is one of the most widely accepted conceptualizations of the term. This definition of social capital is quantifiable and widely held to be more precise than the one popularized by Robert Putnam. Lin also rejects Putnam's thesis, put forward in Bowling Alone, that social capital is decreasing; he maintains that it is, in fact, on the ascent thanks to increasingly pervasive online networking.

== Honors and awards ==
Lin is an academician at the Academia Sinica, Taiwan. He delivered the Fei Xiao-tong Memorial Lecture at Peking University in 2008, was honored the same year at the “Re-construction and Development of Sociology in China and Nan Lin’s Intellectual Thoughts” at Tsinghua University, and gave the Famous Foreign Lectures at the Interuniversity Center for Social Science Theory and Methodology at the University of Groningen in 2006. He holds an honorary doctorate degree from the National Chengchi University and distinguished visiting or honorary professorships at many universities and institutes, including Nankai University, Renmin University, Fudan University, Peking University, Academia Sinica, Huazhong University of Science and Technology, Jilin University, Tianjin Academy of Social Sciences and Shanghai Academy of Social Sciences. Lin received the Distinguished Research Contribution Award by the International Association of Chinese Management Research in 2010.

== Publications ==
Lin has authored or edited eleven books, forty book chapters and numerous journal articles. His books include Social Capital: A Theory of Social Structure and Action, which has been praised as "the definitive work on the subject of social capital," amongst others:

- Lin, Nan; Karen S. Cook; Ronald S. Burt (2001-07-01). Social Capital: Theory and Research. New Brunswick, NJ: Transaction. ISBN 978-0-202-30644-5.
- Lin, Nan (2001). Social Capital: A Theory of Social Structure and Action. Cambridge: Cambridge University Press. ISBN 978-0-521-52167-3.
- Lin, Nan; Bonnie Erickson, eds. (2008-03-06). Social Capital: An International Research Program. Oxford: Oxford University Press. ISBN 978-0-19-923438-7.
