= Kazuo Yamaguchi =

- Kazuo Yamaguchi
- Born: 6 August 1946 (age 80); Tokyo, Japan
- Title: Ralph Lewis Professor of Sociology
- Awards: Person of Cultural Merit (2020)

Academic background
- Education: University of Tokyo (Mathematics, 1971); University of Chicago (M.A. in Sociology, 1979; Ph.D. in Sociology, 1981)
- Doctoral advisor: James Samuel Coleman

Academic work
- Discipline: Sociology
- Institutions: University of Chicago; University of California, Los Angeles; Columbia University

Kazuo Yamaguchi (山口一男, Yamaguchi Kazuo; born August 6, 1946) is a Japanese sociologist and the Ralph Lewis Professor of Sociology at the University of Chicago. He previously held the Hanna Holborn Gray Professorship from 2005 to 2013.

== Education and academic career ==
Yamaguchi studied mathematics at the University of Tokyo, graduating in 1971. He earned an M.A. in sociology in 1979 and a Ph.D. in sociology in 1981 from the University of Chicago. His doctoral dissertation, The Structure of Occupational Mobility, had James Samuel Coleman as chairman of the dissertation committee.

Yamaguchi held faculty positions at Columbia University and the University of California, Los Angeles before becoming a professor of sociology at the University of Chicago in 1991.

Yamaguchi has served on the editorial boards of the American Journal of Sociology, American Sociological Review, The British Journal of Sociology, Sociological Methodology, and Rationality and Society.

== Selected bibliography ==
=== Books ===
- Yamaguchi, Kazuo (1991). Event history analysis. Newbury Park, California: Sage Publications. ISBN 9780803933248.

=== Journal article ===
- Yamaguchi, Kazuo (1983). "The Structure of Intergenerational Occupational Mobility: Generality and Specificity in Resources, Channels, and Barriers". American Journal of Sociology. 88 (4): 718–745. doi:10.1086/227730.
- Yamaguchi, Kazuo; Kandel, Denise B. (1984). "Patterns of Drug Use from Adolescence to Young Adulthood: II. Sequences of Progression". American Journal of Public Health. 74 (7): 668–672. doi:10.2105/ajph.74.7.668.
- Yamaguchi, Kazuo; Kandel, Denise B. (1984). "Patterns of Drug Use from Adolescence to Young Adulthood: III. Predictors of Progression". American Journal of Public Health. 74 (7): 673–681. doi:10.2105/ajph.74.7.673.
- Yamaguchi, Kazuo; Kandel, Denise B. (1985). "On the Resolution of Role Incompatibility: A Life Event History Analysis of Family Roles and Marijuana Use". American Journal of Sociology. 90 (6): 1284–1325. doi:10.1086/228211.
- Yamaguchi, Kazuo; Kandel, Denise B. (1985). "Dynamic Relationships between Premarital Cohabitation and Illicit Drug Use: An Event-History Analysis of Role Selection and Role Socialization". American Sociological Review. 50 (4): 530–546. doi:10.2307/2095437.
- Kandel, Denise B.; Yamaguchi, Kazuo (1987). "Job Mobility and Drug Use: An Event History Analysis". American Journal of Sociology. 92 (4): 836–878. doi:10.1086/228585.
- Yamaguchi, Kazuo (1987). "Models for Comparing Mobility Tables: Toward Parsimony and Substance". American Sociological Review. 52 (4): 482–494. doi:10.2307/2095293.
- Yamaguchi, Kazuo (1989). "A Formal Theory for Male-Preferring Stopping Rules of Childbearing: Sex Differences in Birth Order and in the Number of Siblings". Demography. 26 (3): 451–465. doi:10.2307/2061604.
- Yamaguchi, Kazuo (1990). "Homophily and Social Distance in the Choice of Multiple Friends: An Analysis Based on Conditionally Symmetric Log-Bilinear Association Models". Journal of the American Statistical Association. 85 (410): 356–366. doi:10.1080/01621459.1990.10476208.
- Yamaguchi, Kazuo (1992). "Accelerated Failure-Time Regression Models with a Regression Model of Surviving Fraction: An Application to the Analysis of "Permanent Employment" in Japan". Journal of the American Statistical Association. 87 (418): 284–292. doi:10.1080/01621459.1992.10475207.
- Yamaguchi, Kazuo; Kandel, Denise B. (1993). "Marital Homophily on Illicit Drug Use among Young Adults: Assortative Mating or Marital Influence?". Social Forces. 72 (2): 505–528. doi:10.1093/sf/72.2.505.
- Kandel, Denise B.; Yamaguchi, Kazuo (1993). "From Beer to Crack: Developmental Patterns of Drug Involvement". American Journal of Public Health. 83 (6): 851–855. doi:10.2105/ajph.83.6.851.
- Yamaguchi, Kazuo; Ferguson, Linda R. (1995). "The Stopping and Spacing of Childbirths and Their Birth-History Predictors: Rational-Choice Theory and Event-History Analysis". American Sociological Review. 60 (2): 272–298. doi:10.2307/2096387.
- Yamaguchi, Kazuo (1996). "Power in Networks of Substitutable and Complementary Exchange Relations: A Rational-Choice Model and an Analysis of Power Centralization". American Sociological Review. 61 (2): 308–332. doi:10.2307/2096336.
- Yamaguchi, Kazuo; Kandel, Denise B. (1996). "Parametric Event Sequence Analysis: An Application to an Analysis of Gender and Racial/Ethnic Differences in Patterns of Drug-Use Progression". Journal of the American Statistical Association. 91 (436): 1388–1399. doi:10.1080/01621459.1996.10476707.
- Yamaguchi, Kazuo (May 2000). "Multinomial logit latent-class regression models: an analysis of the predictors of gender role attitudes among Japanese women". American Journal of Sociology. 105 (6): 1702–1740. doi:10.1086/210470. S2CID 144752407.
- Yamaguchi, Kazuo; Wang, Yantao (2002). "Class Identification of Married Employed Women and Men in America". American Journal of Sociology. 108 (2): 440–475. doi:10.1086/344813.
- Yamaguchi, Kazuo (2011). "Decomposition of Inequality among Groups by Counterfactual Modeling: An Analysis of the Gender Wage Gap in Japan". Sociological Methodology. 41 (1): 223–255. doi:10.1111/j.1467-9531.2011.01241.x.
- Yamaguchi, Kazuo (2012). "Log-linear Causal Analysis of Cross-classified Categorical Data". Sociological Methodology. 42 (1): 257–285. doi:10.1177/0081175012460661.
- Yamaguchi, K. (2013). New Regression Models with Egocentric Social Network Data. Sociological Methodology, 43(1), 312-345. doi:10.1177/0081175013490189
- Yamaguchi, K. (2017). Decomposition Analysis of Segregation. Sociological Methodology, 47(1), 246-273. doi:10.1177/0081175017692625
- Yamaguchi, Kazuo (2021). "Multigroup Segregation Analyses with Covariates". Sociological Methodology. 51 (2): 224–252. doi:10.1177/0081175020981120.
- Yamaguchi, Kazuo (2023). "A New RCM Approach to Survival Analysis: The Conditional-Incidence-Rate Model". Sociological Methodology. 53 (1): 42–71. doi:10.1177/00811750221114857.
- Yamaguchi, K., & Zhou, J. (2024). Multivariate Multinomial Logit Models with Associations among Dependent Variables. Sociological Methodology, 54(2), 351-384. doi:10.1177/00811750241239049

=== Papers ===
- Yamaguchi, Kazuo (1996). Disappearing minority: women's permanent labor-force nonparticipation in Japan and the determinants of its historical change. Chicago Illinois: Population Research Center, NORC and the University of Chicago. OCLC 37037000.

== Honours ==
- Person of Cultural Merit (2020)
