= Stanley Wasserman =

American sociologist (born 1951)

Stanley S. Wasserman
- Born: August 29, 1951 (age 75); Louisville, Kentucky, U.S.
- Education: University of Pennsylvania; Harvard University
- Known for: Social network analysis Mathematical sociology Network science Multidimensional network
- Awards: J. Parker Bursk Memorial Award in 1973
- Scientific career
- Fields: Statistics
- Workplaces: Indiana University; Rudy Professor of Statistics, Psychology, and Sociology; National Research University – Higher School of Economics; Academic Supervisor
- Doctoral advisor: Frederick Mosteller

Stanley Wasserman (born August 29, 1951) is an American statistician and prior to retirement was the Rudy Professor of Statistics, Psychology, and Sociology at Indiana University Bloomington and the Academic Supervisor of the International laboratory for Applied Network Research at Moscow's National Research University – Higher School of Economics (since 2014). He is known for his work on social network analysis, mathematical sociology, network science and multidimensional networks. In 2017 Wasserman launched the Master's program 'Applied statistics with Network Analysis' at National Research University – Higher School of Economics.

== Biography ==
Born in Louisville, Kentucky, Wasserman obtained his BSc in economics from the University of Pennsylvania in 1973, as well as his MA in Business & Applied Economics. He then moved to Harvard University, where he obtained his MA in Statistics in 1974, and his PhD in Statistics in 1977 with the thesis, entitled "Stochastic Models for Directed Graphs" under supervision of Frederick Mosteller.

Wasserman started his career in 1974 at the National Bureau of Economics Research as Research Assistant and System Consultant in Statistics. After a year as an instructor at Harvard University, and as a Visiting Instructor at Carnegie-Mellon University, he started in 1977 as assistant professor at the University of Minnesota. In 1982 he moved to the University of Illinois at Urbana–Champaign, where he was appointed associate professor and in 1988 Professor of Psychology, Statistics, and Sociology. Beginning in 2004 he served as the James H. Rudy Professor of Statistics, Psychology, and Sociology at Indiana University in Bloomington.

Wasserman was awarded the J. Parker Bursk Memorial Award in 1973 while at the University of Pennsylvania. He was elected Fellow of the American Statistical Association in 1991, and Fellow of the American Association for the Advancement of Science in 1996.

== Work ==
=== Social network analysis ===
In their 1994 "Advances in social network analysis," Wasserman and Joseph Galaskiewicz address:

... the issue of how effectively to apply the latest developments in social network analysis to behavioural and social science disciplines. Topics examined include: ways to specify the network contents to be studied; how to select the method for representing network structures; how social network analysis has been used to study interorganizational relations via the resource dependence model; how to use a contact matrix for studying the spread of disease in epidemiology; and how cohesion and structural equivalence network theories relate to studying social influence. The book also offers some statistical models for social support networks.

== Books ==
- Wasserman, Stanley, and Faust, Katherine, Social Network Analysis: Methods and Applications (Structural Analysis in the Social Sciences), (First Edition 1994) Cambridge University Press, Cambridge, UK, West 20th St., New York, USA, Melbourne, Madrid, ISBN 978-0521387071
- Wasserman, Stanley, & Galaskiewicz, J.(eds). Advances in Social Network Analysis: Research from the Social and Behavioral Sciences. Newbury Park, CA: Sage Publications.
- Carrington, P., Scott, J., & Wasserman, S. (eds). Models and Methods in Social Network Analysis. New York: Cambridge University Press.
