= Peter Marsden =

American sociologist

- Education: Dartmouth College, University of Chicago
- Known for: Contributions to Social network analysis, organizational theory, sociological methodology.
- Scientific career
- Fields: Sociology, Social network analysis
- Workplaces: Harvard University, University of North Carolina at Chapel Hill
- Doctoral advisor: Edward Laumann, James Samuel Coleman
- Other academic advisors: James A. Davis

Peter Marsden is an American sociologist. He is the Edith and Benjamin Geisinger Professor of Sociology at Harvard University.

== Education and career ==
Marsden received his undergraduate degree (in Sociology and History) at Dartmouth College in 1973 and his graduate degrees at University of Chicago (M.A. in 1975, Ph.D. in 1979). He studied under Edward Laumann. He contributed to developing sociological methods for studying social networks, social organizations, and social inequality via survey research. This research had a major impact on research on issues such as social inequality, status attainment, the epidemic spread of disease, and social isolation.

Marsden began his scholarly career at University of North Carolina at Chapel Hill, and was then appointed to a position at Harvard University in 1987. There he served as Dean of the Social Sciences, as well as the Chair of the Department of Sociology at Harvard between 1992 and 1998 and in 2002–03. He chaired the Policy and Admissions Committee for the Ph.D. Program in Organizational Behavior between 2000 and 2003, and again between 2005 and 2010. From 2011 until 2015 he served as Dean of Social Science in the Faculty of Arts and Sciences.

His research has focused primarily on the structure of social organization, especially formal organizations and social networks. He wrote one of the most highly cited works in the history of sociology on the topic of egocentric social network analysis. He also contributes to social science methodology and the sociology of medicine. Marsden is Co-Principal Investigator of the General Social Survey.

== Selected scholarly works ==
Much of Marsden's work has been cited in reviews of social network analysis. Examples include:

- "Restricted Access in Networks and Models of Power", American Journal of Sociology, 1983.
- "The Boundary Specification Problem in Network Analysis", Chapter 1 of Applied Network Analysis, 1983.
- "Core Discussion Networks of Americans", American Sociological Review, 1987.
- "Network Data and Measurement", Annual Review of Sociology, 1990.
- "Network Studies of Social Influence", Sociological Methods & Research, 1993.
- "Recent Developments in Network Measurement", Models and Methods in Social Network Analysis, 2005.
