= National Center for Education Statistics =

U.S. Department of Education agency

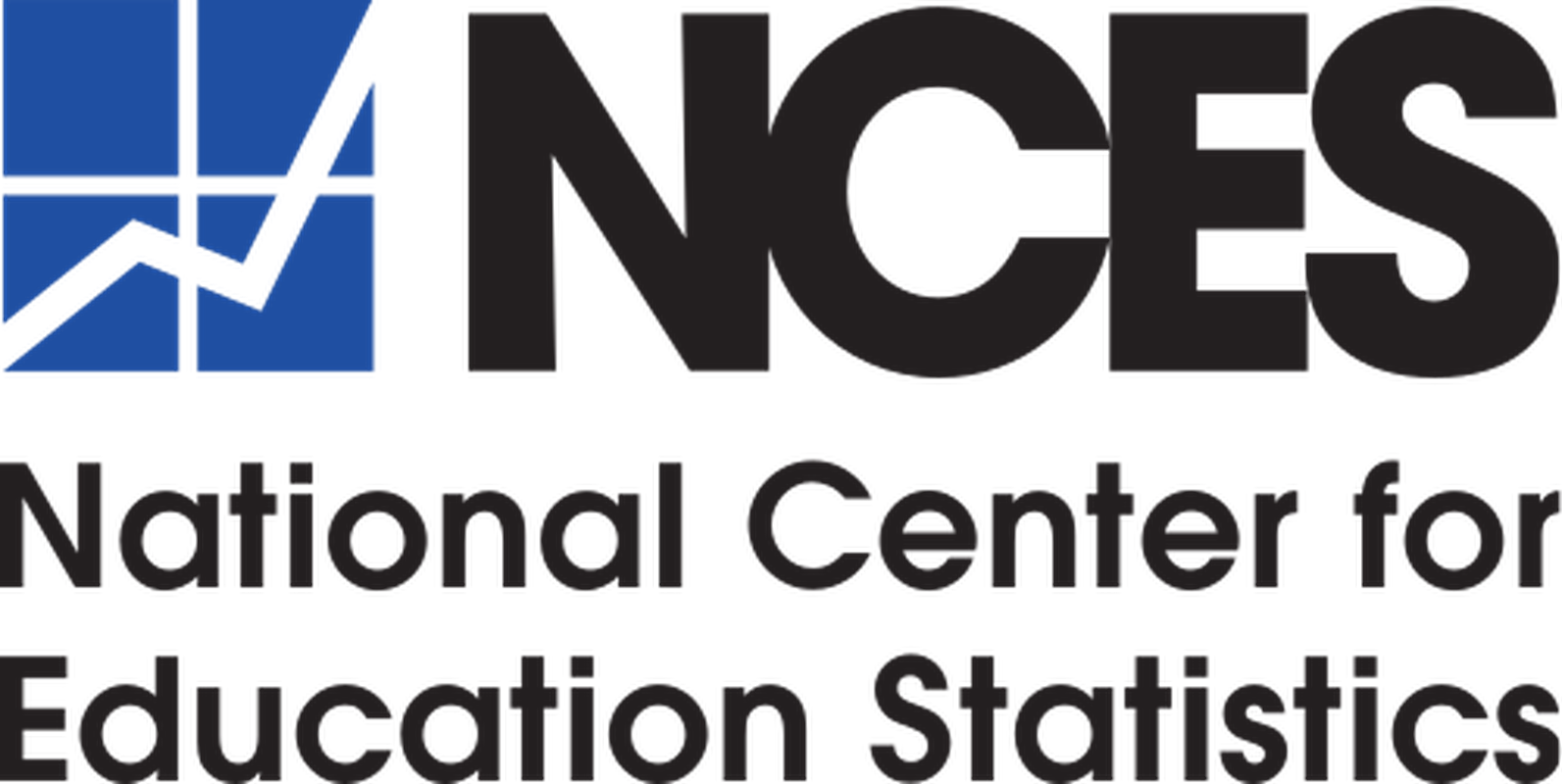

Agency overview
- Formed: 1867; 159 years ago
- Jurisdiction: U.S. federal government
- Headquarters: Potomac Center Plaza; 550 12th St, S.W., Washington, D.C., U.S.; 38°53′00″N 77°01′39″W
- Employees: 84
- Annual budget: $306,500,000 USD
- Agency executive: Peggy G. Carr, Commissioner
- Parent agency: Institute of Education Sciences
- Website: nces.ed.gov

The National Center for Education Statistics (NCES) is the principal federal agency responsible for collecting, analyzing, and reporting data on education in the United States. Established under 20 U.S.C. § 9541, it operates within the Institute of Education Sciences (IES) under the United States Department of Education. NCES provides objective, relevant, timely, and methodologically rigorous education statistics covering preschool, elementary, secondary, and postsecondary education, ensuring data are free of bias, nonideological, and independent of partisan influence.

NCES oversees national and international assessments, conducts longitudinal studies, and develops standardized data systems to support policymakers, researchers, educators, and the public. It also provides technical support to state education agencies and local districts to improve data collection and reporting.

As part of its mandate, NCES disseminates education data through key publications such as The Condition of Education, The Digest of Education Statistics, and a suite of interactive data tools.

As a principal agency of the U.S. federal statistical system, NCES plays a critical role in monitoring and improving the education landscape by ensuring the availability of reliable, high-quality data to inform educational policy and decision-making.

== History ==
The origins of the National Center for Education Statistics (NCES) date back to 1867, when the U.S. Department of Education Act established a federal agency for collecting and reporting statistics on education in the United States.

The agency was originally created as a department, but in 1869, it was renamed the Office of Education and moved under the Department of the Interior, where it remained for 70 years. In 1939, it was transferred to the Federal Security Agency, and in 1953, it became part of the newly created Department of Health, Education, and Welfare (HEW).

In the early years, NCES focused on compiling basic statistics, including public elementary and secondary school enrollments, attendance, teacher salaries, high school graduates, and expenditures. By the 1920s, the agency expanded its statistical programs to include school finance data, private school enrollments, and early efforts to track student progression rates.

During the mid-20th century, NCES expanded its focus to Longitudinal study, early childhood education data, and education finance trends, contributing to key policy debates and legislative efforts. In the 21st century, NCES has adopted digital survey methodologies, interactive geographic mapping, and adaptive data collection strategies to improve efficiency and accessibility.

NCES continues to oversee major data collections, including the Common Core of Data (CCD), Integrated Postsecondary Education Data Systems (IPEDS), and National Assessment of Educational Progress (NAEP), maintaining its role as the primary federal statistical agency for education data.

== Organizational structure ==
The National Center for Education Statistics (NCES) is mandated by Congress to collect, analyze, and report data on the condition and progress of American education. The agency is responsible for conducting statistical analyses, publishing reports, and overseeing international education data comparisons.

The structure and activities of the center consist of the following divisions.

=== Office of the Commissioner ===
The Office of the Commissioner oversees NCES policy, data standards, and operations to ensure the accuracy, confidentiality, and reliability of federal education statistics. The Commissioner, officially known as the Statistics Commissioner, is appointed by the President of the United States and serves a six-year term. Previously, the Commissioner was appointed by the President and confirmed by the U.S. Senate. The Commissioner also serves as the Statistical Official for the U.S. Department of Education, pursuant to Section 314 of the Foundations for Evidence-Based Policymaking Act of 2018 (Public Law No: 115-435).

=== Administrative Data Division (ADD) ===
Administrative Data Division (ADD) oversees planning, design, operations, statistical analysis, reporting, and dissemination of administrative records data at the elementary, secondary, and postsecondary education levels, and on libraries.

=== Assessment Division (AD) ===
Assessment Division (AD) creates, designs, develops, implements and reports on the National Assessment of Educational Progress at the national level and coordinates assessment and related data collection activities with the states. The staff also conducts a variety of other related education assessment studies.

=== Sample Surveys Division (SSD) ===
Sample Surveys Division (SSD) oversees planning design, operations, statistical analysis reporting, and dissemination of data from sample surveys at all levels of education, including early childhood and adult, and international data, such as High School and Beyond (HS&B). Surveys on vocational and technical education are also included in this division.

=== Annual Reports and Information Staff (ARIS) ===
Within the Office of the Statistics Commissioner, the Annual Reports and Information Staff (ARIS) compiles and disseminates statistical analyses on various education topics. It produces annual reports, indicator reports, and digital tools to support evidence-based policy-making. ARIS also produces the Indicators of School Crime and Safety report and serves as the official media contact for NCES. ARIS publications provide critical data for policymakers, researchers, and the public, including:

- Report on the Condition of Education, annual report mandated by the U.S. Congress, produced annually, since 1975, and presented to Congress and the White House.
- Digest of Education Statistics, a compilation of statistical tables covering all levels of education
- Projections of Education Statistics, a report which provides projections for key education statistics
- Indicators of School Crime and Safety, a report that covers topics on crime and safety in elementary, secondary, and postsecondary education
- Education Across America: Cities, Suburbs, Towns, and Rural Areas, a resource designed for individuals interested in the condition of education across different geographic locales within the United States, specifically, cities, suburbs, towns, and rural areas.
- Status and Trends in the Education of Racial and Ethnic Groups, a report that profiles current conditions and recent trends in the education of students by racial and ethnic group
- Trends in High School Dropout and Completion Rates in the United States, an annual report that provides trends in high school dropout and completion rates
- Fast Facts provide users with concise information on a range of educational issues, from early childhood to adult learning. Fast Facts draw from various published sources and are updated as new data become available.

== Current programs of research ==
=== Assessment programs ===
- The National Assessment of Educational Progress (NAEP), a nationwide assessment of achievement among primary and secondary students
- National Literacy Assessments
  - The Young Adult Literacy Assessment (YALA) conducted in 1985, extended the reading portion of the National Assessment of Educational Progress to include a nationally representative sample of 3,600 young adults between the ages of 21 and 25.
  - The National Adult Literacy Survey (NALS), conducted in 1992, surveyed a nationally representative sample of 13,600 adults, age 16 and older, residing in households and prisons and assessed their literacy skills.
  - The National Assessment of Adult Literacy (NAAL), conducted in 2003, surveyed over 19,000 adults in national and state-level assessments, representing the entire population of U.S. adults who are age 16 and older, most in their homes and some in prisons from the 50 states and the District of Columbia.
  - In 2008, NCES decided to participate in the Programme for the International Assessment of Adult Competencies (PIAAC) and to replace its national literacy assessments with the internationally comparable literacy assessment developed by the OECD.
- International Assessments
  - NCES, through its International Activities Program (IAP), administers U.S. participation in several international large-scale assessments:
    - PISA (Programme for International Student Assessment), which evaluates 15-year-old students' performance in reading, mathematics, and science literacy. It was conducted every three years from 2000 through 2025, and now is on a four-year periodicity.
    - TIMSS (Trends in International Mathematics and Science Study), which assesses mathematics and science achievement of 4th and 8th-grade students, has been conducted every four years since 1995.
    - PIRLS (Progress in International Reading Literacy Study), which measures 4th-grade students' reading literacy achievement has been conducted every five years since 2001.
    - ICILS (International Computer and Information Literacy Study), which evaluates 8th-grade students' computer and information literacy skills. The United States participated in ICILS in 2018 and 2023.
    - PIAAC (Programme for the International Assessment of Adult Competencies), which assesses adult skills in literacy, numeracy, and problem-solving.
    - TALIS (Teaching and Learning International Survey), which surveys teachers and school leaders about working conditions and learning environments.
    - These studies are conducted internationally by organizations such as the OECD and IEA, with NCES responsible for U.S. implementation. For each assessment, NCES manages domestic sampling, data collection, quality assurance, analysis, and reporting of U.S. results. NCES also produces specialized reports comparing U.S. education systems with those of other countries. Findings from these international assessments inform American education policy decisions and contribute to global understanding of educational outcomes across different systems.

=== Early childhood studies ===
- The Early Childhood Longitudinal Study (ECLS)
- Components of the National Household Education Survey (NHES)

=== Elementary and secondary studies ===
- The Beginning Teacher Longitudinal Study (BTLS), a study of a cohort of beginning public school teachers initially interviewed as part of the 2007–08 Schools and Staffing Survey
- The Common Core of Data which annually collects fiscal and non-fiscal data about all public schools, public school districts and state education agencies in the United States
- The School Survey on Crime and Safety (SSOCS), a nationally representative cross-sectional survey that collects data on crime and safety from public school principals, providing information about school security practices, disciplinary problems and policies, and the frequency of criminal incidents at schools
- The National Longitudinal Study of the Class of 1972 (NLS:72), which surveyed a nationally representative cohort of high school seniors and collected data over 14 years on their educational attainment, labor market participation, and life choices
- The High School & Beyond Study (HSB), which interviewed high school sophomore and senior cohorts beginning in 1980 in an effort to understand trends in educational attainment, vocation, and labor market choices
- The National Education Longitudinal Study of 1988 (NELS:88), which began with an 8th grade cohort in 1988, providing trend data about critical transitions experienced by young people as they develop, attend school, and embark on their careers
- The Middle Grades Longitudinal Study of 2017–18 (MGLS:2017), the first longitudinal study of a nationally representative cohort of grade 6 students in the United States
- The Education Longitudinal Study of 2002 (ELS:2002), a longitudinal survey that monitors the transitions of a national sample of tenth graders in 2002 to postsecondary education and the world of work
- The High School Longitudinal Study of 2009 (HSLS:09), which follows a cohort of more than 25,000 9th graders in 2009 through their high school, postsecondary, and early career experiences, focusing on college decision-making and on math learning based on a new algebra assessment
- The Private School Universe Survey (PSS), which builds an accurate and complete list of private schools to serve as a sampling frame for NCES sample surveys of private schools and to report data on the total number of private schools, teachers, and students in the survey universe
- The National Household Education Survey (NHES) is a nationally representative survey administered by the NCES, which gathers descriptive data on the educational activities and experiences of the U.S. population. Conducted primarily through mail-based questionnaires, NHES collects information on various education-related topics, including early childhood care and education, children's school readiness, parent and family involvement in education, homeschooling practices, adult educational attainment, and family engagement in civic and community activities
- The Schools and Staffing Survey (SASS), which collects extensive data on American public and private elementary and secondary schools including teachers, principals, schools, school districts, and library media centers. SASS has been replaced by the National Teacher and Principal Survey (NTPS).

=== Postsecondary studies ===
- The Integrated Postsecondary Education Data System (IPEDS), which collects aggregate institutional data on more than 7,000 postsecondary institutions that participate in Title IV federal student aid programs
- The Classification of Instructional Programs (CIP), a taxonomy of academic disciplines used across government and education
- The National Postsecondary Student Aid Study (NPSAS), a nationally representative cross-sectional study of how students and families pay for college
- The Beginning Postsecondary Students Longitudinal Study (BPS), a nationally representative longitudinal study that follows first-time, beginning students for six years after their entry to college and provides information about students' persistence and attainment outcomes
- The Baccalaureate and Beyond Longitudinal Study (B&B), a nationally representative longitudinal study that follows baccalaureate graduates for up to ten years, collecting information on their early labor market experiences and post-baccalaureate training and education

== See also ==
- List of higher education associations and organizations in the United States
