= Cleo Youtz =

American statistician

Cleo S. Youtz (1909–2005) was an American statistician who worked for many years at Harvard University as the research assistant, collaborator, computer, and coauthor of Frederick Mosteller, as manager of Mosteller's other staff, and as the historian of the Harvard statistics department. Youtz was hired by Mosteller in 1957 when he was appointed chair of the newly formed department, and continued working with Mosteller after he retired from teaching in 1987, until he finally left Harvard in 2003.

== Selected publications ==
Although Mosteller did not list Youtz as a coauthor on all of his publications, she was listed on many, including:

- Mosteller, Frederick; Youtz, Cleo (1961), "Tables of the Freeman–Tukey transformations for the binomial and Poisson distributions", Biometrika, 48 (3–4): 433–440, doi:10.1093/biomet/48.3-4.433, MR 0132623
- Mosteller, Frederick; Siegel, Andrew F.; Trapido, Edward; Youtz, Cleo (August 1981), "Eye fitting straight lines", The American Statistician, 35 (3): 150–152, doi:10.1080/00031305.1981.10479335, JSTOR 2683983
- Kong, Augustine; Barnett, G. Octo; Mosteller, Frederick; Youtz, Cleo (September 1986), "How medical professionals evaluate expressions of probability", New England Journal of Medicine, 315 (12): 740–744, doi:10.1056/nejm198609183151206, PMID 3748081
- Reagan, Robert T.; Mosteller, Frederick; Youtz, Cleo (1989), "Quantitative meanings of verbal probability expressions", Journal of Applied Psychology, 74 (3): 433–442, Bibcode:1989JApPs..74..433R, doi:10.1037/0021-9010.74.3.433, PMID 2737992
- Mosteller, Frederick; Youtz, Cleo (1990), "Quantifying probabilistic expressions", Statistical Science, 5 (1): 2–34, JSTOR 2245869, MR 1054855

One of the few publications crediting her as a contributor but not written with Mosteller was a festschrift for Mosteller's 70th birthday, A Statistical Model: Frederick Mosteller's Contributions to Statistics, Science, and Public Policy (1990), which listed her as a collaborator on its title page and stated that "but for her modesty" she should have been listed as one of its editors.
