= Rationality and Society =

- Discipline: Social Sciences
- Language: English
- Edited by: Andreas Flache

Publication details
- History: 1989-present
- Publisher: SAGE Publications
- Frequency: Quarterly
- Impact factor: 0.892 (2020)

Standard abbreviations
- ISO 4: Ration. Soc.

Indexing
- CODEN: RTSOEG
- ISSN: 1043-4631 (print); 1461-7358 (web)
- LCCN: 89650734
- OCLC no.: 41385384

Links
- Journal homepage; Online access; Online archive

Rationality And Society is a peer-reviewed academic journal that publishes papers in the field of sociology. The journal's editor is Andreas Flache (University of Groningen). Founded by James Samuel Coleman, it has been in publication since 1989 and is currently published by SAGE Publications.

== Scope ==
Rationality and Society provides a forum which focuses on the contributions of rational-action based theory, and the questions and controversies surrounding this growth. It publishes theoretical developments, empirical research, and policy analysis.

== Abstracting and indexing ==
Rationality And Society is abstracted and indexed in, among other databases: SCOPUS, and the Social Sciences Citation Index. According to the Journal Citation Reports, its 2020 impact factor is 0.892, ranking it 119 out of 149 journals in the category "Sociology".
