= James Samuel Coleman =

American sociologist (1926–1995)

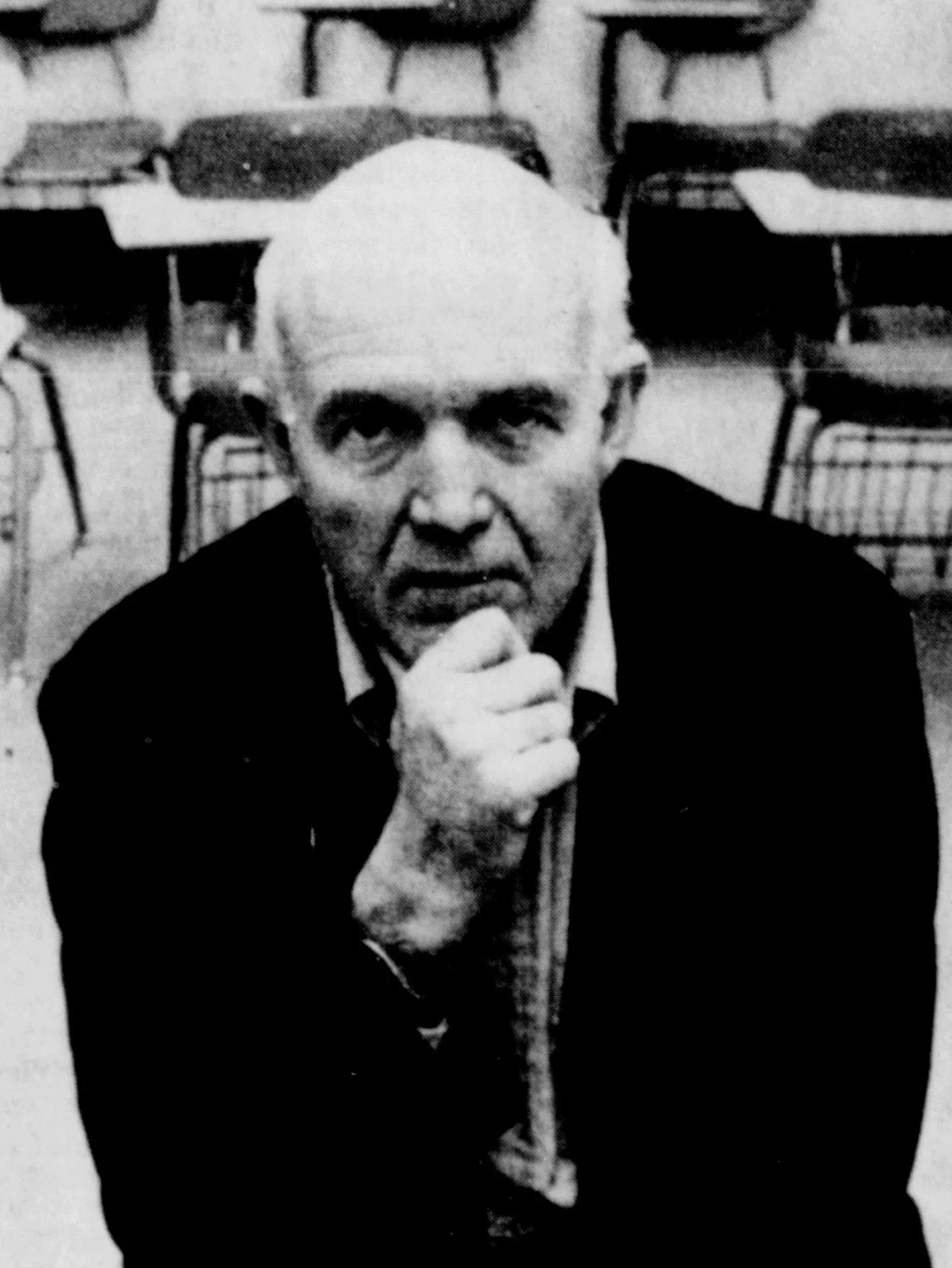
- Coleman in 1980
- Born: May 12, 1926; Bedford, Indiana, United States
- Died: March 25, 1995 (aged 68); Chicago, Illinois, United States
- Education: Purdue University; Columbia University
- Spouse(s): Lucille Richey, Zdzislawa Walaszek
- Children: Thomas, John, Stephen, and Daniel
- Scientific career
- Fields: Sociological theory, Mathematical sociology
- Doctoral advisor: Paul Lazarsfeld
- Doctoral students: Ronald S. Burt, Peter Marsden, Kazuo Yamaguchi

James Samuel Coleman (May 12, 1926 – March 25, 1995) was an American sociologist, theorist, and empirical researcher, based chiefly at the University of Chicago.

He served as president of the American Sociological Association in 1991–1992. He studied the sociology of education and public policy, and was one of the earliest users of the term social capital. He may be considered one of the original neoconservatives in sociology. His work Foundations of Social Theory (1990) influenced countless sociological theories, and his works The Adolescent Society (1961) and "Coleman Report" (Equality of Educational Opportunity, 1966) were two of the most cited books in educational sociology. The landmark Coleman Report helped transform educational theory and reshape national education policies, and it influenced public and scholarly opinion regarding the role of schooling in determining equality and productivity in the United States.

== Early life ==
As the son of James and Maurine Coleman, he spent his early childhood in Bedford, Indiana, he then moved to Louisville, Kentucky. After graduating in 1944, he enrolled in a small school in Virginia, but left to enlist in the US Navy during World War II. After he was discharged from the US Navy in 1946, he enrolled in Indiana University. Eventually he transferred schools, and Coleman received his bachelor's degree in chemical engineering from Purdue University in 1949. He initially intended on studying Chemistry but quickly became fascinated with sociology as he navigated his way through University life. He began working at Eastman Kodak until 1952. He pursued a degree in sociology at Columbia University. During his time there, he spent two years as a research assistant with the Bureau of Applied Social Research, and published a chapter in Mathematical Thinking in the Social Sciences, which was edited by Paul Lazarsfeld. He went on to receive his doctorate from Columbia University in 1955.

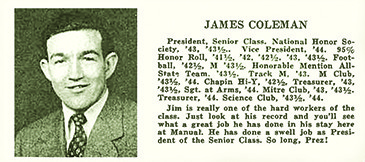
1944 yearbook entry of Coleman

He is best known today for his work on the massive study that produced "Equality of Educational Opportunity" (EEO), or the Coleman Report. Coleman's intellectual appetite was prodigious.

In 1949 he married Lucille Richey with whom he had 3 children, Thomas, John, and Stephen. Lucille and James divorced in 1973 and he later went on to marry his second wife, Zdzislawa Walaszek, with whom he had one son, Daniel Coleman. He died on March 25, 1995, at University Hospital in Chicago Illinois and was outlived by his wife Zdzislawa Walaszek and sons.

== Career ==
Coleman achieved success with two studies on problem solving: Introduction to Mathematical Sociology (1964) and Mathematics of Collective Action (1973). He was a fellow at the Center for Advanced Study in the Behavioral Sciences and taught at the University of Chicago. In 1959, he moved to Johns Hopkins University, where he served as an associate professor and founded the Sociology department. In 1965 he became involved in Project Camelot, an academic research project funded by the United States military through the Special Operations Research Office to train in counter-insurgency techniques. He eventually became a professor in social relations until 1973, when he returned to Chicago to teach as a University Professor of Sociology and Education at the University of Chicago again.

During the mid-1960s and early 1970s, Coleman was an elected member of the American Academy of Arts and Sciences, the American Philosophical Society, and the United States National Academy of Sciences. Proceeding on the assumption that the study of human society can become a true science, the author examines the contribution that various mathematical techniques might make to systematic conceptual elaboration of social behavior. He notes that it is only when the logical structure of mathematics is possible, and claims that in this way mathematics will ultimately become useful in sociology.

Upon his return, he became the professor and senior study director at the National Opinion Research Center. In 1991, Coleman was elected as the eighty-third President of the American Sociological Association. In 2001, Coleman was named among the top 100 American intellectuals, as measured by academic citations, in Richard Posner's book, Public Intellectuals: A Study of Decline. Over his lifetime he published nearly 30 books, and more than 300 articles and book chapters, which contributed to the understanding of education in the United States.

He was influenced by Ernest Nagel and Paul Lazarsfeld, both who interested Coleman in mathematical sociology, and Robert Merton, who introduced Coleman to Émile Durkheim and Max Weber. Coleman is associated with adolescence, corporate action and rational choice. He shares common ground with sociologists Peter Blau, Daniel Bell, and Seymour Martin Lipset, with whom Coleman first did research after obtaining his PhD.

== Major contributions ==
=== Coleman Report ===
Coleman is widely cited in the field of sociology of education. In the 1960s, during his time teaching at Johns Hopkins University, Coleman and several other scholars were commissioned by the National Center for Education Statistics to write a report on educational equality in the US. It was one of the largest studies in history, with more than 650,000 students in the sample. The result was a massive report of over 700 pages. The 1966 report, titled Equality of Educational Opportunity (otherwise known as the "Coleman Report"), fueled debates about "school effects" that are still relevant today. The report is commonly presented as evidence that school funding has little effect on student achievement, a key finding of the report and subsequent research. It was found as for physical facilities, formal curricula, and other measurable criteria, there was little difference between black and white schools. Also, a significant gap in the achievement scores between black and white children already existed in the first grade. Despite the similar conditions of black and white schools, the gap became even wider by the end of elementary school. The only consistent variable explaining the differences in score within each racial group or ethnic group was the educational and economic attainment of the parents. Therefore, student background and socioeconomic status were found to be more important in determining educational outcomes of a student. Specifically, the key factors were the attitudes toward education of parents and caregivers at home and peers at school. Differences in the quality of schools and teachers did have a small impact on student outcomes.

The study cost approximately 1.5 million dollars and to date is one of the largest studies in history, involving 600,000 students and 60,000 teachers in the research sample. The participants were black, Native, and Mexican American, poor white, Puerto Rican and Asian students. This study was a driving factor in the debate for “school effects”, a debate that continues to date. A few major findings and controversies from the study were that black student drop rates were twice as high that of white students, and that poor home environments were a major influence to poor academic performance for minorities.

Eric Hanushek criticized the focus on the statistical methodology and the estimation of the impacts of various factors on achievement which took attention away from the achievement comparisons in the Coleman Report. The study tested students around United States, and the differences in achievement by race and region were enormous. The average black twelfth grade student in the rural South was achieving at the level of a seventh grade white student in the urban Northeast. At the fiftieth anniversary of the report's publication, Eric Hanushek assessed the closure in the black-white achievement gap. He found that achievement differences had narrowed, largely from improvements in the South, but that at the pace of the previous half-century, it would take two-and-a-half centuries to close the mathematics achievement gap.

=== Social capital ===
In Foundations of Social Theory (1990), Coleman discusses his theory of social capital, the set of resources found in family relations and in a community's social organization. Coleman believed that social capital is important for the development of a child or young person, and that functional communities are important as sources of social capital that can support families in terms of youth development. He discusses three main types of capital: human, physical, and social.

Human capital is an individual's skills, knowledge, and experience, which determine their value in society. Physical capital, being completely tangible and generally a private good, originates from the creation of tools to facilitate production. In addition to social capital, the three types of investments create the three main aspects of society's exchange of capital.

According to Coleman, social capital and human capital are often go hand in hand with one another. By having certain skill sets, experiences, and knowledge, an individual can gain social status and so receive more social capital.

“The interrogation by his colleague was likely very difficult to navigate as Coleman was a man who was opposed to segregation. It is known that when Coleman and his wife Lucille Richey brought their three children John, Tom, and Steve to a white only amusement park, outside of Baltimore. They attempted to enter the park with a black family and as anticipated were arrested along with approximately 300 other demonstrators”.

== Legacy ==
Coleman was a pioneer in the construction of mathematical models in sociology with his book, Introduction to Mathematical Sociology (1964). His later treatise, Foundations of Social Theory (1990), made major contributions toward a more rigorous form of theorizing in sociology based on rational choice. Coleman wrote more than thirty books and 300 articles. He also created an educational corporation that developed and marketed "mental games" aimed at improving the abilities of disadvantaged students. Coleman made it a practice to send his most controversial research findings "to his worst critics" prior to their publication, calling it "the best way to ensure validity."

At the time of his death, he was engaged in a long-term study titled the High School and Beyond, which examined the lives and careers of 75,000 people who had been high school juniors and seniors in 1980.

“In 1966, James Coleman presented a report to the U.S Congress where he presented his findings from his research where he spoke of how to reach a racial balance in public schools. He shared his most controversial findings that poor black children did better academically when integrated into middle-class schools”.

Coleman published lasting theories of education, which helped shape the field. With his focus on the allocation of rights, one can understand the conflict between rights. Towards the end of his life, Coleman questioned how to make the education systems more accountable, which caused educators to question their use and interpretation of standardized testing.

Coleman's publication of the "Coleman Report" included greatly influential findings that pioneered aspects of the desegregation of American public schools. His theories of integration also contributed. He also raised the issue of narrowing the educational gap between those who had money and others. By creating a well-rounded student body, a student's educational experience can be greatly benefited.

With Coleman's many shocking findings and conclusions that were drawn from his research, many of the people who were interested and trusted his research including Coleman himself were reluctant to follow them as time passed. Coleman's later studies suggested that desegregation efforts via busing failed due to “white flight” from areas in which students were bussed.

Coleman integrated himself into a teacher lifestyle with the intention of sharing his passion for sociology and continuing his legacy despite his difficulty after his failed research. Having been one of the pioneers in mathematical sociology, it was not uncommon for people to ask Coleman to review papers submitted to various scholarly journals. He had little time on his hands as a well-known sociologist in the United States, in turn he built a seminar on the mathematics of sociology to build more people with the capability and education necessary to broaden and strengthen the field.

== Selected works ==
- Community Conflict (1955)
- Union Democracy: The Internal Politics of the International Typographical Union (1956, with Seymour Martin Lipset and Martin Trow)
- The Adolescent Society: The Social Life on the Teenager and its Impact on Education (1961)
- Introduction to Mathematical Sociology (1964)
- Models of Change and Response Uncertainty (1964)
- Adolescents and the Schools (1965)
- Equality of Educational Opportunity (1966)
- Macrosociology: Research and Theory (1970)
- Resources for Social Change: Race in the United States (1971)
- Youth: Transition to Adulthood (1974)
- High School Achievement (1982)
- The Asymmetrical Society (1982)
- Individual Interests and Collective Action (1986)
- "Social Theory, Social Research, and a Theory of Action", article in American Journal of Sociology 91: 1309–35 (1986).
- 'Social Capital in the Creation of Human Capital", article in American Journal of Sociology, Vol. 94, Supplement: Organizations and Institutions: Sociological and Economic Approaches to the Analysis of Social Structure, pp. S95–120 (1988)
- The Foundations of Social Theory. Cambridge, MA: Belknap of Harvard University Press.
- Equality and Achievement in Education (1990)
- Redesigning American Education (1997, with Barbara Schneider, Stephen Plank, Kathryn S. Schiller, Roger Shouse, & Huayin Wang)

== See also ==
- Economic sociology
- Rational choice theory
- Effective schools
