= Talus =

Talus may refer to:

== People ==
- Talus Taylor (1929–2015), American writer

== Fictional entities ==
- Talos or Talus, a bronze man in Greek mythology
- Talus, a young champion in Paladins: Champions of the Realm
- Talus, a fictional planet in Star Wars
- Talus, a character in The Faerie Queene by Edmund Spenser
- Talus, an enemy in The Legend of Zelda: Breath of the Wild made of animated stone

== Other uses ==
- Talus: almost synonymous with scree, i.e. slope formed by accumulation of rock debris, or the debris itself collected at the base of the cliff
  - Talus cave
- Talus (fortification), a sloped portion of a fortified wall
- Talus bone, an ankle bone
- Talus, an electronic design automation tool by Magma Design Automation

== See also ==
- Tallis (disambiguation)
- Tallus, a communications device in the Marvel Universe
- Talos (disambiguation)
