= Talis =

Talis or TALIS may refer to:

== People ==
- Talis J. Colberg, attorney general of Alaska, appointed 2006
- Talis Kitsing, Estonian kickboxer and politician
- Talis Kimberley, English folk singer-songwriter

== Places ==
- Talis, Pakistan, a village in Ghanche District, Pakistan
- Talış (disambiguation), any of several places in Azerbaijan and Iran

== Other uses ==
- TALIS (Teaching And Learning International Survey) coordinated by OECD.
- Talis (moth), a genus of moths of the family Crambidae
- Talis Group, a software company in Birmingham, England
- Tallit, a Jewish prayer shawl
- Metaclazepam, an anxiolytic drug (trade name Talis)
- Teaching and Learning International Survey, an OECD survey

== See also ==
- Tallis (disambiguation)
- Thales (disambiguation)
- Thalys, a train service between Paris, Brussels, Cologne and Amsterdam
