= Tallas =

Tallas is a surname. Notable people with the surname include:

- Gregg G. Tallas (1909–1993), Greek film director
- G. T. Tallas (1944–2023), American racing driver
- Peggy Jo Tallas (1944–2005), American bank robber
- Rob Tallas (born 1973), Canadian ice hockey player

== See also ==
- Tallis (name)
