= Talis caboensis =

Scientific classification
- Domain: Eukaryota
- Kingdom: Animalia
- Phylum: Arthropoda
- Class: Insecta
- Order: Lepidoptera
- Family: Crambidae
- Subfamily: Crambinae
- Tribe: Ancylolomiini
- Genus: Talis
- Species: T. caboensis

Binomial name
- Talis caboensis Asselbergs, 2009

Species of moth

Talis caboensis is a moth in the family Crambidae. It was described by Jan Asselbergs in 2009 and is found in southern Spain.

The wingspan is about 26.5 mm for males and 21 mm for females.

== Etymology ==
The species is named for Cabo de Gata, the type locality.
