= Talis cornutella =

Scientific classification
- Domain: Eukaryota
- Kingdom: Animalia
- Phylum: Arthropoda
- Class: Insecta
- Order: Lepidoptera
- Family: Crambidae
- Subfamily: Crambinae
- Tribe: Ancylolomiini
- Genus: Talis
- Species: T. cornutella

Binomial name
- Talis cornutella Wang & Sung, 1982

Species of moth

Talis cornutella is a moth in the family Crambidae. It is found in China (Xinjiang).
