= Talis gigantalis =

Scientific classification
- Domain: Eukaryota
- Kingdom: Animalia
- Phylum: Arthropoda
- Class: Insecta
- Order: Lepidoptera
- Family: Crambidae
- Subfamily: Crambinae
- Tribe: Ancylolomiini
- Genus: Talis
- Species: T. gigantalis

Binomial name
- Talis gigantalis Filipjev & Diakonoff, 1924

Species of moth

Talis gigantalis is a moth in the family Crambidae described by Ivan Nikolayevich Filipjev and A. Diakonoff in 1924. It is found in Kazakhstan.
