= Talis mongolica =

Scientific classification
- Domain: Eukaryota
- Kingdom: Animalia
- Phylum: Arthropoda
- Class: Insecta
- Order: Lepidoptera
- Family: Crambidae
- Subfamily: Crambinae
- Tribe: Ancylolomiini
- Genus: Talis
- Species: T. mongolica

Binomial name
- Talis mongolica Bleszynski, 1965

Species of moth

Talis mongolica is a moth in the family Crambidae. It is found in Mongolia.
