= Talis quercella =

Scientific classification
- Domain: Eukaryota
- Kingdom: Animalia
- Phylum: Arthropoda
- Class: Insecta
- Order: Lepidoptera
- Family: Crambidae
- Subfamily: Crambinae
- Tribe: Ancylolomiini
- Genus: Talis
- Species: T. quercella

Binomial name
- Talis quercella (Denis & Schiffermuller, 1775)

Synonyms
- Tinea quercella Denis & Schiffermuller, 1775; Talis occidentalis Amsel, 1949; Talis quercella ab. roburella Krulikovsky, 1909; Tinea neglectella Hübner, 1824; Tinea noctuella Hübner, 1796; Talis quercella var. pallidella Caradja, 1916; Talis suaedella Chrétien, 1910; Talis iranica Amsel, 1949

Species of moth

Talis quercella is a species of moth in the family Crambidae. The species was first described by Michael Denis and Ignaz Schiffermüller in 1775. It is found in Italy, Austria, the Czech Republic, Slovakia, Poland, Hungary, Romania, Bulgaria, Croatia, Ukraine, Russia, Asia Minor, Iraq, Iran, China, Mongolia and North Africa.

The wingspan is about 27 millimetres (1.1 in).

== Subspecies ==
- Talis quercella quercella (Europe, Russia, Asia Minor, Iraq)
- Talis quercella pallidella Caradja, 1916 (Kuldja, Tien-Shan, Mongolia)
- Talis quercella suaedella Chrétien, 1910 (Tunisia, Algeria)
- Talis quercella iranica Amsel, 1949 (Iran)
