= Talis cashmirensis =

Scientific classification
- Kingdom: Animalia
- Phylum: Arthropoda
- Class: Insecta
- Order: Lepidoptera
- Family: Crambidae
- Subfamily: Crambinae
- Tribe: Ancylolomiini
- Genus: Talis
- Species: T. cashmirensis

Binomial name
- Talis cashmirensis (Hampson, 1919)

Synonyms
- Diatraea cashmirensis Hampson, 1919

Species of moth

Talis cashmirensis is a moth in the family Crambidae. It is found in Kashmir.
