= Talis grisescens =

Scientific classification
- Domain: Eukaryota
- Kingdom: Animalia
- Phylum: Arthropoda
- Class: Insecta
- Order: Lepidoptera
- Family: Crambidae
- Subfamily: Crambinae
- Tribe: Ancylolomiini
- Genus: Talis
- Species: T. grisescens

Binomial name
- Talis grisescens Filipjev & Diakonoff, 1924

Species of moth

Talis grisescens is a moth in the family Crambidae described by Ivan Nikolayevich Filipjev and A. Diakonoff in 1924. It is found in Central Asia, where it has been recorded from the Syr Darya region.
