= Talis menetriesi =

Scientific classification
- Kingdom: Animalia
- Phylum: Arthropoda
- Class: Insecta
- Order: Lepidoptera
- Family: Crambidae
- Subfamily: Crambinae
- Tribe: Ancylolomiini
- Genus: Talis
- Species: T. menetriesi

Binomial name
- Talis menetriesi Hampson, 1900

Species of moth

Talis menetriesi is a moth in the family Crambidae described by George Hampson in 1900. It is found in Mongolia and Irkutsk, Russia.
