= Talis pulcherrimus =

Scientific classification
- Domain: Eukaryota
- Kingdom: Animalia
- Phylum: Arthropoda
- Class: Insecta
- Order: Lepidoptera
- Family: Crambidae
- Subfamily: Crambinae
- Tribe: Ancylolomiini
- Genus: Talis
- Species: T. pulcherrimus

Binomial name
- Talis pulcherrimus (Staudinger, 1870)

Synonyms
- Crambus pulcherrimus Staudinger, 1870; Talis pulcherrimus plenostria Filipjev, 1924

Species of moth

Talis pulcherrimus is a species of moth in the family Crambidae. It is found in Russia.
