= Talis wockei =

Scientific classification
- Kingdom: Animalia
- Phylum: Arthropoda
- Clade: Pancrustacea
- Class: Insecta
- Order: Lepidoptera
- Family: Crambidae
- Subfamily: Crambinae
- Tribe: Ancylolomiini
- Genus: Talis
- Species: T. wockei

Binomial name
- Talis wockei Filipjev, 1929

Synonyms
- Talis kansualis Caradja, 1934; Talis menetriesi f. taiskanensis Caradja, 1938

Species of moth

Talis wockei is a moth in the family Crambidae described by Ivan Nikolayevich Filipjev in 1929. It is found in Russia (southern Siberia), Mongolia and China (Kansu, Shantung).
