= Talis pallidalis =

Scientific classification
- Kingdom: Animalia
- Phylum: Arthropoda
- Class: Insecta
- Order: Lepidoptera
- Family: Crambidae
- Subfamily: Crambinae
- Tribe: Ancylolomiini
- Genus: Talis
- Species: T. pallidalis

Binomial name
- Talis pallidalis Hampson, 1900

Species of moth

Talis pallidalis is a moth in the family Crambidae. It is found in Turkmenistan.
