= Tallis =

Tallis may refer to:

== People ==
- Tallis (name)
- Often Thomas Tallis (c. 1505 – 1585). English composer

== Arts, entertainment, and media ==
=== Fictional entities ===
- Tallis, a world in Kathy Tyers' Firebird series
- Tallis family (Briony, Cecilia, Emily, Jack and Leon), a fictitious wealthy family central to the plot of Atonement
- Canon Tallis, a recurring character in both the "Kairos" and "Chronos" series by Madeleine L'Engle
- Tallis, a character in the Dragon Age media franchise

=== Music ===
- Tallis, a rock band formed by former Jethro Tull members John Evan and David Palmer
- Tallis Festival, a choral event hosted in London every 12 to 18 months
- The Tallis Scholars, British early music ensemble named after Thomas Tallis
- Thomas Tallis, 16th century English choral composer, regarded as one of the greatest composers in English history

=== Other arts, entertainment, and media ===
- Tallis, a publishing company formed by Edgar Wallace to promote his novel The Four Just Men
- Tallis Directory, a gazetteer of Gravesend, England published in 1839

== Other uses ==
- Thomas Tallis School in Greenwich, London, England
- Tallit, a Jewish religious garment

== See also ==
- Talis (disambiguation)
