= Programme for International Student Assessment =

Scholastic performance study by the OECD

- Abbreviation: PISA
- Formation: 1997
- Purpose: Comparison of education attainment across the world
- Headquarters: OECD Headquarters
- Location: 2 rue André Pascal, 75775 Paris Cedex 16
- Region served: World
- Members: 79 government education departments
- Official language: English and French
- Head of the Early Childhood and Schools Division: Yuri Belfali
- Main organ: PISA Governing Body (Chair – Michele Bruniges)
- Parent organization: OECD
- Website: www.oecd.org/pisa/

PISA average scores (2022)

Mathematics

Science

Reading

Score is higher than 549
Score equal to or between 500 and 549
Score equal to or between 450 and 499
Score equal to or between 400 and 449
Score equal to or between 350 and 399
Score is less than 345
No data

The Programme for International Student Assessment (PISA) is a worldwide study by the Organisation for Economic Co-operation and Development (OECD) in member and non-member nations intended to evaluate educational systems by measuring 15-year-old school pupils' scholastic performance on mathematics, science, and reading. It was first performed in 2000 and then repeated every three years. Its aim is to provide comparable data to enable countries to improve their education policies and outcomes. It measures problem solving and cognition.

The results of the 2022 data collection were released in December 2023.

PISA 2025 was the largest assessment cycle conducted by the programme to date, involving more than 760,000 students across 91 countries and economies and representing about 33 million 15-year-olds. Science was the major assessment domain, while reading and mathematics were also assessed. Across OECD countries, the average scores were 482 in science, 463 in mathematics, and 461 in reading. The results, released on 8 September 2026, showed relatively stable science performance compared with 2022 but further declines in reading and mathematics.

== Influence and impact ==
PISA, and similar international standardised assessments of educational attainment are increasingly used in the process of education policymaking at both national and international levels.

PISA was conceived to set in a wider context the information provided by national monitoring of education system performance through regular assessments within a common, internationally agreed framework; by investigating relationships between student learning and other factors they can "offer insights into sources of variation in performances within and between countries".

Until the 1990s, few European countries used national tests. In the 1990s, ten countries / regions introduced standardised assessment, and since the early 2000s, ten more followed suit. By 2009, only five European education systems had no national student assessments.

The impact of these international standardised assessments in the field of educational policy has been significant, in terms of the creation of new knowledge, changes in assessment policy, and external influence over national educational policy more broadly.

=== Creation of new knowledge ===
Data from international standardised assessments can be useful in research on causal factors within or across education systems. Mons notes that the databases generated by large-scale international assessments have made it possible to carry out inventories and comparisons of education systems on an unprecedented scale (Note: 40 countries participated back then, and 81 countries and economies participated in the 2022 data collection.) on themes ranging from the conditions for learning mathematics and reading, to institutional autonomy and admissions policies. They allow typologies to be developed that can be used for comparative statistical analyses of education performance indicators, thereby identifying the consequences of different policy choices. They have generated new knowledge about education: PISA findings have challenged deeply embedded educational practices, such as the early tracking of students into vocational or academic pathways.

Barroso and de Carvalho find that PISA provides a common reference connecting academic research in education and the political realm of public policy, operating as a mediator between different strands of knowledge from the realm of education and public policy. However, although the key findings from comparative assessments are widely shared in the research community the knowledge they create does not necessarily fit with government reform agendas; this leads to some inappropriate uses of assessment data.

=== Changes in national assessment policy ===
Emerging research suggests that international standardised assessments are having an impact on national assessment policy and practice. PISA is being integrated into national policies and practices on assessment, evaluation, curriculum standards and performance targets; its assessment frameworks and instruments are being used as best-practice models for improving national assessments; many countries have explicitly incorporated and emphasise PISA-like competencies in revised national standards and curricula; others use PISA data to complement national data and validate national results against an international benchmark.

=== External influence over national educational policy ===
PISA may influence national education policy choices in a variety of ways. Participation in international assessments like PISA has been linked to significant education policy changes and outcomes, such as higher student enrollments and education reforms. However, critics have argued that participation could lead to undesirable outcomes, such as higher repetition rates and narrowing of curricula. The impact of PISA may also vary according to the specific country context.

Policy-makers in most participating countries see PISA as an important indicator of system performance; PISA reports can define policy problems and set the agenda for national policy debate; policymakers seem to accept PISA as a valid and reliable instrument for internationally benchmarking system performance and changes over time; most countries—irrespective of whether they performed above, at, or below the average PISA score—have begun policy reforms in response to PISA reports.

Against this, impact on national education systems varies markedly. For example, in Germany, the results of the first PISA assessment caused the so-called 'PISA shock': a questioning of previously accepted educational policies; in a state marked by jealously guarded regional policy differences, it led ultimately to an agreement by all Länder to introduce common national standards and even an institutionalised structure to ensure that they were observed. In Hungary, by comparison, which shared similar conditions to Germany, PISA results have not led to significant changes in educational policy.

Because many countries have set national performance targets based on their relative rank or absolute PISA score, PISA assessments have increased the influence of their (non-elected) commissioning body, the OECD, as an international education monitor and policy actor, which implies an important degree of 'policy transfer' from the international to the national level; PISA in particular is having "an influential normative effect on the direction of national education policies". Thus, it is argued that the use of international standardised assessments has led to a shift towards international, external accountability for national system performance; Rey contends that PISA surveys, portrayed as objective, third-party diagnoses of education systems, actually serve to promote specific orientations on educational issues.

National policy actors refer to high-performing PISA countries to "help legitimise and justify their intended reform agenda within contested national policy debates". PISA data can be "used to fuel long-standing debates around pre-existing conflicts or rivalries between different policy options, such as in the French Community of Belgium". In such instances, PISA assessment data are used selectively: in public discourse governments often only use superficial features of PISA surveys such as country rankings and not the more detailed analyses. Rey (2010:145, citing Greger, 2008) notes that often the real results of PISA assessments are ignored as policymakers selectively refer to data in order to legitimise policies introduced for other reasons.

In addition, PISA's international comparisons can be used to justify reforms with which the data themselves have no connection; in Portugal, for example, PISA data were used to justify new arrangements for teacher assessment (based on inferences that were not justified by the assessments and data themselves); they also fed the government's discourse about the issue of pupils repeating a year, (which, according to research, fails to improve student results). In Finland, the country's PISA results (that are in other countries deemed to be excellent) were used by Ministers to promote new policies for 'gifted' students. Such uses and interpretations often assume causal relationships that cannot legitimately be based upon PISA data which would normally require fuller investigation through qualitative in-depth studies and longitudinal surveys based on mixed quantitative and qualitative methods, which politicians are often reluctant to fund.

Recent decades have witnessed an expansion in the uses of PISA and similar assessments, from assessing students' learning, to connecting "the educational realm (their traditional remit) with the political realm". This raises the question of whether PISA data are sufficiently robust to bear the weight of the major policy decisions that are being based upon them, for, according to Breakspear, PISA data have "come to increasingly shape, define and evaluate the key goals of the national / federal education system". This implies that those who set the PISA tests – e.g. in choosing the content to be assessed and not assessed – are in a position of considerable power to set the terms of the education debate, and to orient educational reform in many countries around the globe.

== Framework ==
PISA stands in a tradition of international school studies, undertaken since the late 1950s by the International Association for the Evaluation of Educational Achievement (IEA). Much of PISA's methodology follows the example of the Trends in International Mathematics and Science Study (TIMSS, started in 1995), which in turn was much influenced by the U.S. National Assessment of Educational Progress (NAEP). The reading component of PISA is inspired by the IEA's Progress in International Reading Literacy Study (PIRLS).

PISA aims to test literacy of students in three competence fields: reading, mathematics, science on an indefinite scale.

The PISA mathematics literacy test asks students to apply their mathematical knowledge to solve problems set in real-world contexts. To solve the problems students must activate a number of mathematical competencies as well as a broad range of mathematical content knowledge. TIMSS, on the other hand, measures more traditional classroom content such as an understanding of fractions and decimals and the relationship between them (curriculum attainment). PISA claims to measure education's application to real-life problems and lifelong learning (workforce knowledge).

In the reading test, "OECD/PISA does not measure the extent to which 15-year-old students are fluent readers or how competent they are at word recognition tasks or spelling." Instead, they should be able to "construct, extend and reflect on the meaning of what they have read across a wide range of continuous and non-continuous texts."

PISA also assesses students in innovative domains. In 2012 and 2015 in addition to reading, mathematics and science, they were tested in collaborative problem solving. In 2018 the additional innovative domain was global competence.

== Implementation ==
PISA is sponsored, governed, and coordinated by the OECD, but paid for by participating countries.

== Method of testing ==
=== Sampling ===
The students tested by PISA are aged between 15 years and 3 months and 16 years and 2 months at the beginning of the assessment period. The school year pupils are in is not taken into consideration. Only students at school are tested, not home-schoolers. In PISA 2006, however, several countries also used a grade-based sample of students. This made it possible to study how age and school year interact.

To fulfill OECD requirements, each country must draw a sample of at least 5,000 students. In small countries like Iceland and Luxembourg, where there are fewer than 5,000 students per year, an entire age cohort is tested. Some countries used much larger samples than required to allow comparisons between regions.

=== Test ===
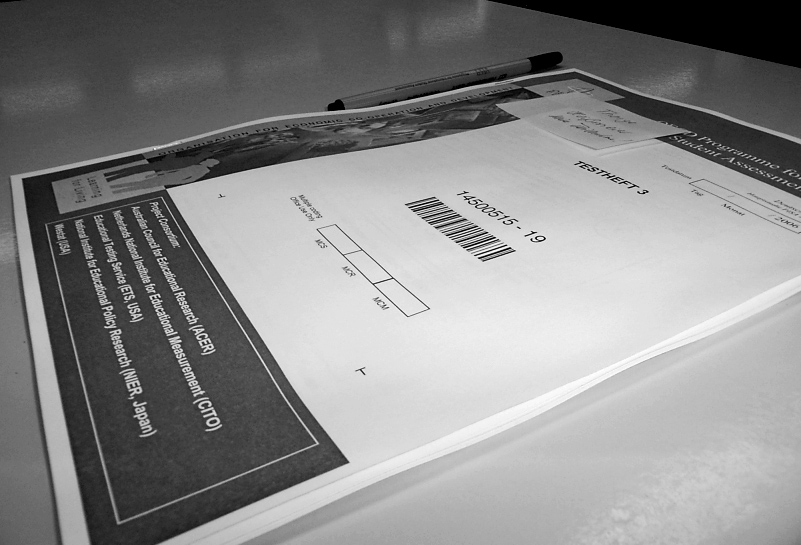
PISA test documents on a school table (Neues Gymnasium, Oldenburg, Germany, 2006)

Each student takes a two-hour computer based test. Part of the test is multiple-choice and part involves fuller answers. There are six and a half hours of assessment material, but each student is not tested on all the parts. Following the cognitive test, participating students spend nearly one more hour answering a questionnaire on their background including learning habits, motivation, and family. School directors fill in a questionnaire describing school demographics, funding, etc. In 2012 the participants were, for the first time in the history of large-scale testing and assessments, offered a new type of problem, i.e. interactive (complex) problems requiring exploration of a novel virtual device.

In selected countries, PISA started experimentation with computer adaptive testing.

=== National add-ons ===
Countries are allowed to combine PISA with complementary national tests.

Germany does this in a very extensive way: On the day following the international test, students take a national test called PISA-E (E=Ergänzung=complement). Test items of PISA-E are closer to TIMSS than to PISA. While only about 5,000 German students participate in the international and the national test, another 45,000 take the national test only. This large sample is needed to allow an analysis by federal states. Following a clash about the interpretation of 2006 results, the OECD warned Germany that it might withdraw the right to use the "PISA" label for national tests.

=== Data scaling ===
From the beginning, PISA has been designed with one particular method of data analysis in mind. Since students work on different test booklets, raw scores must be 'scaled' to allow meaningful comparisons. Scores are thus scaled so that the OECD average in each domain (mathematics, reading, and science) is 500, and the standard deviation is 100. This is true only for the initial PISA cycle when the scale was first introduced, though, subsequent cycles are linked to the previous cycles through IRT scale linking methods.

This generation of proficiency estimates is done using a latent regression extension of the Rasch model, a model of item response theory (IRT), also known as conditioning model or population model. The proficiency estimates are provided in the form of so-called plausible values, which allow unbiased estimates of differences between groups. The latent regression, together with the use of a Gaussian prior probability distribution of student competencies allows estimation of the proficiency distributions of groups of participating students. The scaling and conditioning procedures are described in nearly identical terms in the Technical Reports of PISA 2000, 2003, 2006. NAEP and TIMSS use similar scaling methods.

== Ranking results ==
All PISA results are tabulated by country; recent PISA cycles have separate provincial or regional results for some countries. Most public attention concentrates on just one outcome: the mean scores of countries and their rankings of countries against one another. In the official reports, however, country-by-country rankings are given not as simple league tables but as cross tables indicating for each pair of countries whether or not mean score differences are statistically significant (unlikely to be due to random fluctuations in student sampling or in item functioning). In favourable cases, a difference of 9 points is sufficient to be considered significant.

=== PISA 2025 ranking summary ===
The results of PISA 2025 were published in September 2026. More than 760,000 students, representing around 33 million 15-year-olds across 91 countries and economies, participated in the assessment. The main subject of the PISA 2025 assessment was science proficiency. The Chinese provinces/municipalities of Beijing, Shanghai, Jiangsu and Zhejiang (B-S-J-Z) recorded the highest mean scores in mathematics and science, while Singapore recorded the highest mean score in reading.

The rankings below order countries and economies by their reported mean scores. As in the PISA 2022 ranking summary, these are simple ordinal rankings of reported means; small differences in scores are not necessarily statistically significant.

Science

Rank	Country/economy	Score
1	B-S-J-Z (China)	597
2	Singapore	560
3	(Macau) Macao (China)	541
4	Taiwan	540
5	Japan	538
6	Estonia	527
7	South Korea	526
8	United Kingdom	511
9	Canada*	510
10	Australia	509
11	New Zealand*	509
12	Finland	504
13	United States*	502
14	Switzerland	501
15	(Republic of Ireland) Ireland	500
16	Austria	497
17	Hong Kong (China)	496
18	Poland	495
19	(Turkey) Türkiye	494
20	Belgium	490
21	Czech Republic	490
22	Lithuania	488
23	Germany	486
24	Netherlands*	485
25	Sweden	485
26	Slovenia	484
27	France	483
28	Italy	483
29	Portugal	482
International Average (OECD)		482
30	Hungary	480
31	Denmark	478
32	Spain	477
33	Croatia	476
34	Slovakia	475
35	Luxembourg	474
36	Norway*	470
37	Latvia	468
38	United Arab Emirates	458
39	Vietnam	457
40	Malta	453
41	(Ukraine) Ukrainian regions (17 of 27)	448
42	Uruguay	445
43	Chile	442
44	Israel	442
45	Iceland	441
46	Brunei Darussalam	439
47	Mauritius	438
48	Uzbekistan	438
49	Albania*	435
50	Montenegro	435
51	Greece	434
52	Qatar	434
53	Thailand	432
54	Serbia	429
55	Romania	425
56	Costa Rica	424
57	Mongolia	424
58	(Georgia (country)) Georgia	422
59	Moldova	422
60	Bulgaria	421
61	Kazakhstan	420
62	Malaysia	419
63	Colombia	414
64	Mexico	414
65	Saudi Arabia	413
66	Cyprus	411
67	Azerbaijan	409
68	Brazil	409
69	Jordan	407
70	Peru	406
71	Argentina	393
72	Ecuador	393
73	Indonesia	389
74	El Salvador	385
75	Cambodia	382
76	North Macedonia	378
77	Philippines	373
78	Lebanon	372
79	Armenia	369
80	Kyrgyzstan	363
81	Dominican Republic	361
82	(Palestine) Palestinian Authority	359
83	Morocco	358
84	Kosovo	357
85	Paraguay	355
86	Kurdistan Region (Iraq)	352
87	Guatemala	351
88	Zambia	337
89	Kenya	335
90	Dushanbe (Tajikistan)	334
91	Rwanda	317

Mathematics

Rank	Country/economy	Score
1	B-S-J-Z (China)	612
2	Singapore	563
3	(Macau) Macao (China)	549
4	Taiwan	546
5	Japan	525
6	Hong Kong (China)	522
7	South Korea	522
8	Estonia	508
9	Switzerland	499
10	United Kingdom	488
11	Canada*	485
12	Poland	484
13	Netherlands*	483
14	Belgium	480
15	(Republic of Ireland) Ireland	480
16	New Zealand*	480
17	Australia	478
18	Austria	477
19	Czech Republic	477
20	Denmark	471
21	Lithuania	470
22	Finland	469
23	Slovakia	469
24	Italy	468
25	Germany	464
26	Sweden	464
27	United States*	463
International Average (OECD)		463
28	(Turkey) Türkiye	462
29	Latvia	460
30	Portugal	460
31	Slovenia	460
32	Hungary	459
33	France	458
34	Luxembourg	458
35	Spain	457
36	Croatia	455
37	United Arab Emirates	453
38	Norway*	452
39	Iceland	450
40	Vietnam	443
41	Malta	439
42	Brunei Darussalam	435
43	Albania*	433
44	Israel	433
45	(Ukraine) Ukrainian regions (17 of 27)	431
46	Greece	424
47	Azerbaijan	422
48	Mongolia	419
49	Romania	419
50	Serbia	417
51	(Georgia (country)) Georgia	416
52	Qatar	416
53	Kazakhstan	414
54	Cyprus	412
55	Montenegro	411
56	Moldova	410
57	Mauritius	407
58	Thailand	407
59	Bulgaria	405
60	Uruguay	405
61	Chile	403
62	Malaysia	397
63	Saudi Arabia	390
64	Jordan	388
65	Mexico	388
66	Costa Rica	387
67	Dushanbe (Tajikistan)	382
68	Peru	382
69	Colombia	381
70	North Macedonia	380
71	Brazil	377
72	Lebanon	377
73	Armenia	376
74	Philippines	371
75	Argentina	367
76	Cambodia	366
77	Ecuador	366
78	Indonesia	364
79	Kyrgyzstan	364
80	Morocco	355
81	(Palestine) Palestinian Authority	354
82	Kosovo	350
83	El Salvador	346
84	Dominican Republic	339
85	Kurdistan Region (Iraq)	339
86	Guatemala	334
87	Paraguay	334
88	Kenya	326
89	Zambia	314
90	Rwanda	312

Reading

Rank	Country/economy	Score
1	Singapore	535
2	B-S-J-Z (China)	527
3	Taiwan	508
4	Japan	503
5	South Korea	501
6	(Macau) Macao (China)	501
7	(Republic of Ireland) Ireland	500
8	Estonia	499
9	New Zealand*	497
10	United Kingdom	494
11	Australia	491
12	Canada*	490
13	United States*	490
14	Poland	482
15	Hong Kong (China)	480
16	Finland	474
17	Italy	474
18	(Turkey) Türkiye	472
19	Switzerland	470
20	Czech Republic	468
21	Austria	467
22	Belgium	466
23	Sweden	466
24	Germany	465
25	Lithuania	464
26	Portugal	462
International Average (OECD)		461
27	Denmark	460
28	France	456
29	Croatia	453
30	Norway*	453
31	Hungary	452
32	Spain	451
33	Slovakia	448
34	Slovenia	445
35	Luxembourg	443
36	Netherlands*	441
37	Chile	436
38	Israel	436
39	United Arab Emirates	433
40	Latvia	430
41	Brunei Darussalam	426
42	Greece	423
43	Uruguay	423
44	Iceland	422
45	Montenegro	418
46	Qatar	418
47	(Ukraine) Ukrainian regions (17 of 27)	418
48	Costa Rica	416
49	Malta	415
50	Serbia	415
51	Romania	413
52	Albania*	408
53	Brazil	408
54	Mexico	408
55	Mauritius	405
56	Moldova	404
57	Colombia	399
58	Malaysia	393
59	Thailand	392
60	Vietnam	392
61	Peru	390
62	Argentina	389
63	Bulgaria	387
64	Saudi Arabia	387
65	Ecuador	385
66	Kazakhstan	385
67	(Georgia (country)) Georgia	384
68	Cyprus	379
69	Azerbaijan	374
70	Mongolia	374
71	Dushanbe (Tajikistan)	368
72	Philippines	367
73	El Salvador	366
74	Indonesia	365
75	Jordan	363
76	North Macedonia	357
77	Paraguay	352
78	(Palestine) Palestinian Authority	350
79	Armenia	348
80	Cambodia	347
81	Dominican Republic	346
82	Kyrgyzstan	344
83	Kosovo	340
84	Guatemala	337
85	Lebanon	331
86	Zambia	325
87	Morocco	321
88	Kenya	320
89	Kurdistan Region (Iraq)	312
90	Rwanda	301

* Caution is required when interpreting estimates because one or more PISA sampling standards were not met. Canada, the Netherlands, New Zealand and Norway are fully reported with an asterisk; Albania and the United States have limited reporting with an asterisk.

Uzbekistan has a reported science mean score but no reported reading or mathematics mean score in Table I.1, so it appears only in the science ranking.

=== PISA 2022 ranking summary ===
The results of PISA 2022 were presented on 5 December 2023, which included data for around 700,000 participating students in 81 countries and economies, with Singapore emerging as the top performer in all categories.

Both Lebanon and the Chinese provinces/municipalities of Beijing, Shanghai, Jiangsu and Zhejiang participated this edition, but their results were not published as they were not able to fully collect data because of COVID restrictions.

Because of the Russian full-scale invasion of Ukraine, only 18 of 27 Ukrainian regions had their data collected, thus the results are not representative of the following regions: Dnipropetrovsk Oblast, Donetsk Oblast, Kharkiv Oblast, Luhansk Oblast, Zaporizhzhia Oblast, Kherson Oblast, Mykolaiv Oblast, the Autonomous Republic of Crimea and the city of Sevastopol.

Mathematics

1	Singapore	575
2	Macau	552
3	Taiwan	547
4	Hong Kong	540
5	Japan	536
6	South Korea	527
7	Estonia	510
8	Switzerland	508
9	Canada	497
10	Netherlands	493
11	Ireland	492
12	Belgium	489
13	Denmark	489
14	United Kingdom	489
15	Poland	489
16	Australia	487
17	Austria	487
18	Czech Republic	487
19	Slovenia	485
20	Finland	484
21	Latvia	483
22	Sweden	482
23	New Zealand	479
24	Germany	475
25	Lithuania	475
26	France	474
27	Spain	473
28	Hungary	473
29	Portugal	472
	International Average (OECD)	472
30	Italy	471
31	Vietnam	469
32	Norway	468
33	Malta	466
34	United States	465
35	Slovakia	464
36	Croatia	463
37	Iceland	459
38	Israel	458
39	Turkey	453
40	Brunei	442
41	Ukraine	441
42	Serbia	440
43	United Arab Emirates	431
44	Greece	430
45	Romania	428
46	Kazakhstan	425
47	Mongolia	425
48	Cyprus	418
49	Bulgaria	417
50	Moldova	417
51	Qatar	414
52	Chile	412
53	Uruguay	409
54	Malaysia	409
55	Montenegro	406
56	Azerbaijan	397
57	Mexico	395
58	Thailand	394
59	Peru	391
60	Georgia	390
61	North Macedonia	389
62	Saudi Arabia	389
63	Costa Rica	385
64	Colombia	383
65	Brazil	379
66	Argentina	378
67	Jamaica	377
68	Albania	368
69	Indonesia	366
70	Palestinian Authority	366
71	Morocco	365
72	Uzbekistan	364
73	Jordan	361
74	Panama	357
75	Kosovo	355
76	Philippines	355
77	Guatemala	344
78	El Salvador	343
79	Dominican Republic	339
80	Paraguay	338
81	Cambodia	336

Science

1	Singapore	561
2	Japan	547
3	Macau	543
4	Taiwan	537
5	South Korea	528
6	Estonia	526
7	Hong Kong	520
8	Canada	515
9	Finland	511
10	Australia	507
11	Ireland	504
12	New Zealand	504
13	Switzerland	503
14	Slovenia	500
15	United Kingdom	500
16	United States	499
17	Poland	499
18	Czech Republic	498
19	Denmark	494
20	Latvia	494
21	Sweden	494
22	Germany	492
23	Austria	491
24	Belgium	491
25	Netherlands	488
26	France	487
27	Hungary	486
28	Spain	485
29	International Average (OECD)	485
	Lithuania	484
30	Portugal	484
31	Croatia	483
32	Norway	478
33	Italy	477
34	Turkey	476
35	Vietnam	472
36	Malta	466
37	Israel	465
38	Slovakia	462
39	Ukraine	450
40	Iceland	447
41	Serbia	447
42	Brunei	446
43	Chile	444
44	Greece	441
45	Uruguay	435
46	United Arab Emirates	432
47	Qatar	432
48	Romania	428
49	Kazakhstan	423
50	Bulgaria	421
51	Moldova	417
52	Malaysia	416
53	Mongolia	412
54	Cyprus	411
55	Colombia	411
56	Costa Rica	411
57	Mexico	410
58	Thailand	409
59	Peru	408
60	Argentina	406
61	Brazil	403
62	Jamaica	403
63	Montenegro	403
64	Saudi Arabia	390
65	Panama	388
66	Georgia	384
67	Indonesia	383
68	Azerbaijan	380
69	North Macedonia	380
70	Albania	376
71	Jordan	375
72	El Salvador	374
73	Guatemala	373
74	Palestinian Authority	369
75	Paraguay	368
76	Morocco	365
77	Dominican Republic	360
78	Kosovo	357
79	Philippines	356
80	Uzbekistan	355
81	Cambodia	347

Reading

1	Singapore	543
2	Ireland	516
3	Japan	516
4	South Korea	515
5	Taiwan	515
6	Estonia	511
7	Macau	510
8	Canada	507
9	United States	504
10	New Zealand	501
11	Hong Kong	500
12	Australia	498
13	United Kingdom	494
14	Finland	490
15	Denmark	489
16	Poland	489
17	Czech Republic	489
18	Sweden	487
19	Switzerland	483
20	Italy	482
21	Germany	480
22	Austria	480
23	Belgium	479
24	Norway	477
25	Portugal	477
26	International Average (OECD)	476
27	Croatia	475
28	Latvia	475
29	Spain	474
	France	474
30	Israel	474
31	Hungary	473
32	Lithuania	472
33	Slovenia	469
34	Vietnam	462
35	Netherlands	459
36	Turkey	456
37	Chile	448
38	Slovakia	447
39	Malta	445
40	Serbia	440
41	Greece	438
42	Iceland	436
43	Uruguay	430
44	Brunei	429
45	Romania	428
46	Ukraine	428
47	Qatar	419
48	United Arab Emirates	417
49	Costa Rica	415
50	Mexico	415
51	Moldova	411
52	Brazil	410
53	Jamaica	410
54	Colombia	409
55	Peru	408
56	Montenegro	405
57	Bulgaria	404
58	Argentina	401
59	Panama	392
60	Malaysia	388
61	Kazakhstan	386
62	Saudi Arabia	383
63	Cyprus	381
64	Thailand	379
65	Mongolia	378
66	Georgia	374
67	Guatemala	374
68	Paraguay	373
69	Azerbaijan	365
70	El Salvador	365
71	Indonesia	359
72	North Macedonia	359
73	Albania	358
74	Dominican Republic	351
75	Palestinian Authority	349
76	Philippines	347
77	Jordan	342
78	Kosovo	342
79	Morocco	339
80	Uzbekistan	336
81	Cambodia	329

=== Previous years ===
Period	Focus	OECD countries	Partner countries	Participating students	Notes
2000	Reading	28	4 + 11	265,000	The Netherlands disqualified from data analysis. 11 additional non-OECD countries took the test in 2002.
2003	Mathematics	30	11	275,000	UK disqualified from data analysis, due to its low response rate. Also included test in problem solving.
2006	Science	30	27	400,000	Reading scores for US disqualified from analysis due to misprint in testing materials.
2009	Reading	34	41 + 10	470,000	10 additional non-OECD countries took the test in 2010.
2012	Mathematics	35	37	510,000	
2015	Science	34	31	509,000	
2018	Reading	37	42	600,000	
2022	Mathematics	37	44	690,000	

=== Rankings comparison 2000–2022 ===
Mathematics
Country	2022		2018		2015		2012		2009		2006		2003		2000	
Country	Score	Rank	Score	Rank	Score	Rank	Score	Rank	Score	Rank	Score	Rank	Score	Rank	Score	Rank
International Average (OECD)	472	—	489	—	490	—	494	—	495	—	494	—	499	—	492	—
Albania	368	68	437	48	413	57	394	54	377	53	—	—	—	—	381	33
Algeria	—	—	—	—	360	72	—	—	—	—	—	—	—	—	—	—
Argentina	378	66	379	71	409	58	—	—	—	—	—	—	—	—	388	30
Australia	487	17	491	29	494	25	504	17	514	13	520	12	524	10	533	6
Austria	487	16	499	23	497	20	506	16	496	22	505	17	506	18	503	12
China B-S-J-G (Note: Beijing, Shanghai, Jiangsu, Guangdong)	—	—	—	—	531	6	—	—	—	—	—	—	—	—	—	—
China B-S-J-Z (Note: Beijing, Shanghai, Jiangsu, Zhejiang)	—	—	591	1	—	—	—	—	—	—	—	—	—	—	—	—
China Shanghai	—	—	—	—	—	—	613	1	—	—	—	—	—	—	—	—
Azerbaijan Baku	397	56	420	56	—	—	—	—	—	—	—	—	—	—	—	—
Belarus	—	—	472	38	—	—	—	—	—	—	—	—	—	—	—	—
Belgium	489	12	508	15	507	15	515	13	515	12	520	11	529	7	520	8
Bosnia and Herzegovina	—	—	406	62	—	—	—	—	—	—	—	—	—	—	—	—
Brazil	379	65	384	70	377	68	389	55	386	51	370	50	356	39	334	35
Brunei	442	40	430	51	—	—	—	—	—	—	—	—	—	—	—	—
Bulgaria	417	49	436	49	441	47	439	43	428	41	413	43	—	—	430	28
Argentina CABA (Note: Ciudad Autónoma de Buenos Aires)	—	—	—	—	456	43	418	49	—	—	—	—	—	—	—	—
Cambodia	336	81	—	—	—	—	—	—	—	—	—	—	—	—	—	—
Canada	497	9	512	12	516	10	518	11	527	8	527	7	532	6	533	6
Chile	412	52	417	59	423	50	423	47	421	44	411	44	—	—	384	32
Taiwan	547	3	531	5	542	4	560	3	543	4	549	1	—	—	—	—
Colombia	383	64	391	69	390	64	376	58	381	52	370	49	—	—	—	—
Costa Rica	385	63	402	63	400	62	407	53	—	—	—	—	—	—	—	—
Croatia	463	36	464	40	464	41	471	38	460	38	467	34	—	—	—	—
Cyprus	418	48	451	45	437	48	—	—	—	—	—	—	—	—	—	—
Czech Republic	487	18	499	22	492	28	499	22	493	25	510	15	516	12	498	14
Denmark	489	13	509	13	511	12	500	20	503	17	513	14	514	14	514	10
Dominican Republic	339	79	325	78	328	73	—	—	—	—	—	—	—	—	—	—
El Salvador	343	78	—	—	—	—	—	—	—	—	—	—	—	—	—	—
Estonia	510	7	523	8	520	9	521	9	512	15	515	13	—	—	—	—
Finland	484	20	507	16	511	13	519	10	541	5	548	2	544	2	536	5
France	474	26	495	25	493	26	495	23	497	20	496	22	511	15	517	9
Georgia	390	60	398	66	404	60	—	—	—	—	—	—	—	—	—	—
Germany	475	25	500	20	506	16	514	14	513	14	504	19	503	19	490	16
Greece	430	44	451	44	454	44	453	40	466	37	459	37	445	32	447	24
Guatemala	344	77	—	—	—	—	—	—	—	—	—	—	—	—	—	—
Hong Kong	540	4	551	4	548	2	561	2	555	2	547	3	550	1	560	1
Hungary	473	28	481	36	477	37	477	37	490	27	491	26	490	25	488	17
Iceland	459	37	495	26	488	31	493	25	507	16	506	16	515	13	514	10
Indonesia	366	70	379	72	386	66	375	60	371	55	391	47	360	37	367	34
Ireland	492	11	500	21	504	18	501	18	487	30	501	21	503	20	503	12
Israel	458	38	463	41	470	39	466	39	447	39	442	38	—	—	433	26
Italy	471	30	487	31	490	30	485	30	483	33	462	36	466	31	457	22
Jamaica	377	67	—	—	—	—	—	—	—	—	—	—	—	—	—	—
Japan	536	5	527	6	532	5	536	6	529	7	523	9	534	5	557	2
Jordan	361	73	400	65	380	67	386	57	387	50	384	48	—	—	—	—
Kazakhstan	425	46	423	54	460	42	432	45	405	48	—	—	—	—	—	—
South Korea	527	6	526	7	524	7	554	4	546	3	547	4	542	3	547	3
Kosovo	355	75	366	75	362	71	—	—	—	—	—	—	—	—	—	—
Latvia	483	21	496	24	482	34	491	26	482	34	486	30	483	27	463	21
Lebanon	—	—	393	68	396	63	—	—	—	—	—	—	—	—	—	—
Lithuania	475	24	481	35	478	36	479	35	477	35	486	29	—	—	—	—
Luxembourg	—	—	483	33	486	33	490	27	489	28	490	27	493	23	446	25
Macau	552	2	558	3	544	3	538	5	525	10	525	8	527	8	—	—
Malaysia	409	54	440	47	446	45	421	48	—	—	—	—	—	—	—	—
Malta	466	33	472	39	479	35	—	—	—	—	—	—	—	—	—	—
Mexico	395	57	409	61	408	59	413	50	419	46	406	45	385	36	387	31
Moldova	414	50	421	55	420	52	—	—	—	—	—	—	—	—	—	—
Mongolia	425	47	—	—	—	—	—	—	—	—	—	—	—	—	—	—
Montenegro	406	55	430	53	418	54	410	51	403	49	399	46	—	—	—	—
Morocco	365	71	368	74	—	—	—	—	—	—	—	—	—	—	—	—
Netherlands	493	10	519	9	512	11	523	8	526	9	531	5	538	4	—	—
New Zealand	479	23	494	27	495	21	500	21	519	11	522	10	523	11	537	4
Macedonia	389	62	394	67	371	69	—	—	—	—	—	—	—	—	381	33
Norway	468	32	501	19	502	19	489	28	498	19	490	28	495	22	499	13
Palestinian Authority	366	69	—	—	—	—	—	—	—	—	—	—	—	—	—	—
Panama	357	74	353	76	—	—	—	—	—	—	—	—	—	—	—	—
Paraguay	338	80	—	—	—	—	—	—	—	—	—	—	—	—	—	—
Peru	391	59	400	64	387	65	368	61	365	57	—	—	—	—	292	36
Philippines	355	76	353	77	—	—	—	—	—	—	—	—	—	—	—	—
Poland	489	15	516	10	504	17	518	12	495	23	495	24	490	24	470	20
Portugal	472	29	492	28	492	29	487	29	487	31	466	35	466	30	454	23
Qatar	414	51	414	60	402	61	376	59	368	56	318	52	—	—	—	—
Romania	428	45	430	52	444	46	445	42	427	42	415	42	—	—	426	29
Russia	—	—	488	30	494	23	482	32	468	36	476	32	468	29	478	18
Serbia	440	42	448	46	—	—	—	—	—	—	—	—	—	—	—	—
Saudi Arabia	389	61	373	73	—	—	—	—	—	—	—	—	—	—	—	—
Singapore	575	1	569	2	564	1	573	1	562	1	—	—	—	—	—	—
Slovakia	464	35	486	32	475	38	482	33	497	21	492	25	498	21	—	—
Slovenia	485	19	509	14	510	14	501	19	501	18	504	18	—	—	—	—
Spain	473	27	481	34	486	32	484	31	483	32	480	31	485	26	476	19
Sweden	482	22	502	17	494	24	478	36	494	24	502	20	509	16	510	11
Switzerland	508	8	515	11	521	8	531	7	534	6	530	6	527	9	529	7
Thailand	394	58	419	57	415	56	427	46	419	45	417	41	417	35	432	27
Trinidad and Tobago	—	—	—	—	417	55	—	—	414	47	—	—	—	—	—	—
Tunisia	—	—	—	—	367	70	388	56	371	54	365	51	359	38	—	—
Turkey	453	39	454	42	420	51	448	41	445	40	424	40	423	33	—	—
Ukraine (Note: Except for regions occupied by Russia)	441	41	453	43	—	—	—	—	—	—	—	—	—	—	—	—
United Arab Emirates	431	43	435	50	427	49	434	44	—	—	—	—	—	—	—	—
United Kingdom	489	14	502	18	492	27	494	24	492	26	495	23	508	17	529	7
United States	465	34	478	37	470	40	481	34	487	29	474	33	483	28	493	15
Uruguay	409	53	418	58	418	53	409	52	427	43	427	39	422	34	—	—
Uzbekistan	364	72	—	—	—	—	—	—	—	—	—	—	—	—	—	—
Vietnam	469	31	—	—	495	22	511	15	—	—	—	—	—	—	—	—

Science
Country	2022		2018		2015		2012		2009		2006	
Country	Score	Rank	Score	Rank	Score	Rank	Score	Rank	Score	Rank	Score	Rank
International Average (OECD)	485	—	489	—	493	—	501	—	501	—	498	—
Albania	376	70	417	59	427	54	397	58	391	54	—	—
Algeria	—	—	—	—	376	72	—	—	—	—	—	—
Argentina	406	60	404	65	432	52	—	—	—	—	—	—
Australia	507	10	503	17	510	14	521	14	527	9	527	8
Austria	491	23	490	28	495	26	506	21	494	28	511	17
China B-S-J-G	—	—	—	—	518	10	—	—	—	—	—	—
China B-S-J-Z	—	—	590	1	—	—	—	—	—	—	—	—
China Shanghai	—	—	—	—	—	—	580	1	—	—	—	—
Azerbaijan Baku	380	68	398	68	—	—	—	—	—	—	—	—
Belarus	—	—	471	37	—	—	—	—	—	—	—	—
Belgium	491	24	499	20	502	20	505	22	507	19	510	18
Bosnia and Herzegovina	—	—	398	67	—	—	—	—	—	—	—	—
Brazil	403	62	404	66	401	66	402	55	405	49	390	49
Brunei	446	42	431	50	—	—	—	—	—	—	—	—
Bulgaria	421	50	424	56	446	46	446	43	439	42	434	40
Argentina CABA	—	—	—	—	475	38	425	49	—	—	—	—
Cambodia	347	81	—	—	—	—	—	—	—	—	—	—
Canada	515	8	518	8	528	7	525	9	529	7	534	3
Chile	444	43	444	45	447	45	445	44	447	41	438	39
Taiwan	537	4	516	10	532	4	523	11	520	11	532	4
Colombia	411	54	413	62	416	60	399	56	402	50	388	50
Costa Rica	411	55	416	60	420	58	429	47	—	—	—	—
Croatia	483	31	472	36	475	37	491	32	486	35	493	25
Cyprus	411	56	439	47	433	51	—	—	—	—	—	—
Czech Republic	498	18	497	21	493	29	508	20	500	22	513	14
Denmark	494	20	493	25	502	21	498	25	499	24	496	23
Dominican Republic	360	77	336	78	332	73	—	—	—	—	—	—
El Salvador	373	72	—	—	—	—	—	—	—	—	—	—
Estonia	526	6	530	4	534	3	541	5	528	8	531	5
Finland	511	9	522	6	531	5	545	4	554	1	563	1
France	487	26	493	24	495	27	499	24	498	25	495	24
Georgia	384	66	383	73	411	63	—	—	—	—	—	—
Germany	492	22	503	16	509	16	524	10	520	12	516	12
Greece	441	44	452	44	455	44	467	40	470	38	473	37
Guatemala	373	73	—	—	—	—	—	—	—	—	—	—
Hong Kong	520	7	517	9	523	9	555	1	549	2	542	2
Hungary	486	27	481	32	477	35	494	30	503	20	504	20
Iceland	447	41	475	35	473	39	478	37	496	26	491	26
Indonesia	383	67	396	70	403	65	382	60	383	55	393	48
Ireland	504	12	496	22	503	19	522	13	508	18	508	19
Israel	465	37	462	42	467	40	470	39	455	39	454	38
Italy	477	33	468	40	481	34	494	31	489	33	475	35
Jamaica	403	63	—	—	—	—	—	—	—	—	—	—
Japan	547	2	529	5	538	2	547	3	539	4	531	6
Jordan	375	71	429	51	409	64	409	54	415	47	422	43
Kazakhstan	423	49	397	69	456	43	425	48	400	53	—	—
South Korea	528	5	519	7	516	11	538	6	538	5	522	10
Kosovo	357	78	365	75	378	71	—	—	—	—	—	—
Latvia	494	19	487	29	490	31	502	23	494	29	490	27
Lebanon	—	—	384	72	386	68	—	—	—	—	—	—
Lithuania	484	29	482	31	475	36	496	28	491	31	488	31
Luxembourg	—	—	477	34	483	33	491	33	484	36	486	33
Macau	543	3	544	3	529	6	521	15	511	16	511	16
Malaysia	416	52	438	48	443	47	420	50	—	—	—	—
Malta	466	36	457	43	465	41	—	—	—	—	—	—
Mexico	410	57	419	57	416	61	415	52	416	46	410	47
Moldova	417	51	428	52	428	53	—	—	—	—	—	—
Mongolia	412	53	—	—	—	—	—	—	—	—	—	—
Montenegro	403	61	415	61	411	62	410	53	401	51	412	46
Morocco	365	76	377	74	—	—	—	—	—	—	—	—
Netherlands	488	25	503	15	509	17	522	12	522	10	525	9
New Zealand	504	11	508	12	513	12	516	16	532	6	530	7
Macedonia	380	69	413	63	384	70	—	—	—	—	—	—
Norway	478	32	490	27	498	24	495	29	500	23	487	32
Palestinian Authority	369	74	—	—	—	—	—	—	—	—	—	—
Panama	388	65	365	76	—	—	—	—	—	—	—	—
Paraguay	368	75	—	—	—	—	—	—	—	—	—	—
Peru	408	59	404	64	397	67	373	61	369	57	—	—
Philippines	356	79	357	77	—	—	—	—	—	—	—	—
Poland	499	17	511	11	501	22	526	8	508	17	498	22
Portugal	484	30	492	26	501	23	489	34	493	30	474	36
Qatar	432	46	419	58	418	59	384	59	379	56	349	52
Romania	428	48	426	55	435	50	439	46	428	43	418	45
Russia	—	—	478	33	487	32	486	35	478	37	479	34
Serbia	447	40	440	46	—	—	—	—	—	—	—	—
Saudi Arabia	390	64	386	71	—	—	—	—	—	—	—	—
Singapore	561	1	551	2	556	1	551	2	542	3	—	—
Slovakia	462	38	464	41	461	42	471	38	490	32	488	29
Slovenia	500	14	507	13	513	13	514	18	512	15	519	11
Spain	485	28	483	30	493	30	496	27	488	34	488	30
Sweden	494	21	499	19	493	28	485	36	495	27	503	21
Switzerland	503	13	495	23	506	18	515	17	517	13	512	15
Thailand	409	58	426	53	421	57	444	45	425	45	421	44
Trinidad and Tobago	—	—	—	—	425	56	—	—	410	48	—	—
Tunisia	—	—	—	—	386	69	398	57	401	52	386	51
Turkey	476	34	468	39	425	55	463	41	454	40	424	42
Ukraine	450	39	469	38	—	—	—	—	—	—	—	—
United Arab Emirates	432	47	434	49	437	48	448	42	—	—	—	—
United Kingdom	500	15	505	14	509	15	514	19	514	14	515	13
United States	499	16	502	18	496	25	497	26	502	21	489	28
Uruguay	435	45	426	54	435	49	416	51	427	44	428	41
Uzbekistan	355	80	—	—	—	—	—	—	—	—	—	—
Vietnam	472	35	—	—	525	8	528	7	—	—	—	—

Reading
Country	2022		2018		2015		2012		2009		2006		2003		2000	
Country	Score	Rank	Score	Rank	Score	Rank	Score	Rank	Score	Rank	Score	Rank	Score	Rank	Score	Rank
International Average (OECD)	476	—	487	—	493	—	496	—	493	—	489	—	494	—	493	—
Albania	358	73	405	61	405	63	394	58	385	55	—	—	—	—	349	39
Algeria	—	—	—	—	350	71	—	—	—	—	—	—	—	—	—	—
Argentina	401	58	402	63	425	56	—	—	—	—	—	—	—	—	—	—
Australia	498	12	503	16	503	16	512	12	515	8	513	7	525	4	528	4
Austria	480	21	484	27	485	33	490	26	470	37	490	21	491	22	492	19
China B-S-J-G	—	—	—	—	494	27	—	—	—	—	—	—	—	—	—	—
China B-S-J-Z	—	—	555	1	—	—	—	—	—	—	—	—	—	—	—	—
China-Shanghai	—	—	—	—	—	—	570	1	—	—	—	—	—	—	—	—
Azerbaijan Baku	365	69	389	68	—	—	—	—	—	—	—	—	—	—	—	—
Belarus	—	—	474	36	—	—	—	—	—	—	—	—	—	—	—	—
Belgium	479	23	493	22	499	20	509	16	506	10	501	11	507	11	507	11
Bosnia and Herzegovina	—	—	403	62	—	—	—	—	—	—	—	—	—	—	—	—
Brazil	410	52	413	57	407	62	407	52	412	49	393	47	403	36	396	36
Brunei	429	44	408	59	—	—	—	—	—	—	—	—	—	—	—	—
Bulgaria	404	57	420	54	432	49	436	47	429	42	402	43	—	—	430	32
Argentina CABA	—	—	—	—	475	38	429	48	—	—	—	—	—	—	—	—
Cambodia	329	81	—	—	—	—	—	—	—	—	—	—	—	—	—	—
Canada	507	8	520	6	527	3	523	7	524	5	527	4	528	3	534	2
Chile	448	37	452	43	459	42	441	43	449	41	442	37	—	—	410	35
Taiwan	515	5	503	17	497	23	523	8	495	21	496	15	—	—	—	—
Colombia	409	54	412	58	425	57	403	54	413	48	385	49	—	—	—	—
Costa Rica	415	50	426	49	427	52	441	45	—	—	—	—	—	—	—	—
Croatia	475	26	479	29	487	31	485	33	476	34	477	29	—	—	—	—
Cyprus	381	63	424	50	443	45	—	—	—	—	—	—	—	—	—	—
Czech Republic	489	17	490	25	487	30	493	24	478	32	483	25	489	24	492	20
Denmark	489	15	501	18	500	18	496	23	495	22	494	18	492	19	497	16
Dominican Republic	351	74	342	76	358	69	—	—	—	—	—	—	—	—	—	—
El Salvador	365	70	—	—	—	—	—	—	—	—	—	—	—	—	—	—
Estonia	511	6	523	5	519	6	516	10	501	12	501	12	—	—	—	—
Finland	490	14	520	7	526	4	524	5	536	2	547	2	543	1	546	1
France	474	29	493	23	499	19	505	19	496	20	488	22	496	17	505	14
Georgia	374	67	380	70	401	65	—	—	—	—	—	—	—	—	—	—
Germany	480	22	498	20	509	11	508	18	497	18	495	17	491	21	484	22
Greece	438	41	457	42	467	41	477	38	483	30	460	35	472	30	474	25
Guatemala	374	66	—	—	—	—	—	—	—	—	—	—	—	—	—	—
Hong Kong	500	11	524	4	527	2	545	1	533	3	536	3	510	9	525	6
Hungary	473	31	476	33	470	40	488	28	494	24	482	26	482	25	480	23
Iceland	436	42	474	35	482	35	483	35	500	15	484	23	492	20	507	12
Indonesia	359	71	371	72	397	67	396	57	402	53	393	46	382	38	371	38
Ireland	516	2	518	8	521	5	523	6	496	19	517	6	515	6	527	5
Israel	474	30	470	37	479	37	486	32	474	35	439	39	—	—	452	29
Italy	482	20	476	32	485	34	490	25	486	27	469	32	476	29	487	21
Jamaica	410	53	—	—	—	—	—	—	—	—	—	—	—	—	—	—
Japan	516	3	504	15	516	8	538	3	520	7	498	14	498	14	522	9
Jordan	342	78	419	55	408	61	399	55	405	51	401	44	—	—	—	—
Kazakhstan	386	61	387	69	427	54	393	59	390	54	—	—	—	—	—	—
South Korea	515	4	514	9	517	7	536	4	539	1	556	1	534	2	525	7
Kosovo	342	77	353	75	347	72	—	—	—	—	—	—	—	—	—	—
Latvia	475	27	479	30	488	29	489	27	484	28	479	27	491	23	458	28
Lebanon	—	—	353	74	347	73	—	—	—	—	—	—	—	—	—	—
Lithuania	472	32	476	34	472	39	477	37	468	38	470	31	—	—	—	—
Luxembourg	—	—	470	38	481	36	488	30	472	36	479	28	479	27	441	30
Macau	510	7	525	3	509	12	509	15	487	26	492	20	498	15	—	—
Malaysia	388	60	415	56	431	50	398	56	—	—	—	—	—	—	—	—
Malta	445	39	448	44	447	44	—	—	—	—	—	—	—	—	—	—
Mexico	415	49	420	53	423	58	424	49	425	44	410	42	400	37	422	34
Moldova	411	51	424	51	416	59	—	—	—	—	—	—	—	—	—	—
Mongolia	378	65	—	—	—	—	—	—	—	—	—	—	—	—	—	—
Montenegro	405	56	421	52	427	55	422	50	408	50	392	48	—	—	—	—
Morocco	339	79	359	73	—	—	—	—	—	—	—	—	—	—	—	—
Netherlands	459	35	485	26	503	15	511	13	508	9	507	10	513	8	—	—
New Zealand	501	10	506	12	509	10	512	11	521	6	521	5	522	5	529	3
Macedonia	359	72	393	67	352	70	—	—	—	—	—	—	—	—	373	37
Norway	477	25	499	19	513	9	504	20	503	11	484	24	500	12	505	13
Palestinian Authority	349	75	—	—	—	—	—	—	—	—	—	—	—	—	—	—
Panama	392	59	377	71	—	—	—	—	—	—	—	—	—	—	—	—
Paraguay	373	68	—	—	—	—	—	—	—	—	—	—	—	—	—	—
Peru	408	55	401	64	398	66	384	61	370	57	—	—	—	—	327	40
Philippines	347	76	340	77	—	—	—	—	—	—	—	—	—	—	—	—
Poland	489	16	512	10	506	13	518	9	500	14	508	8	497	16	479	24
Portugal	477	24	492	24	498	21	488	31	489	25	472	30	478	28	470	26
Qatar	419	47	407	60	402	64	388	60	372	56	312	51	—	—	—	—
Romania	428	45	428	47	434	47	438	46	424	45	396	45	—	—	428	33
Russia	—	—	479	31	495	26	475	40	459	40	440	38	442	32	462	27
Serbia	440	40	439	45	—	—	—	—	—	—	—	—	—	—	—	—
Saudi Arabia	383	62	399	65	—	—	—	—	—	—	—	—	—	—	—	—
Singapore	543	1	549	2	535	1	542	2	526	4	—	—	—	—	—	—
Slovakia	447	38	458	41	453	43	463	41	477	33	466	33	469	31	—	—
Slovenia	469	33	495	21	505	14	481	36	483	29	494	19	—	—	—	—
Spain	474	28	—	—	496	25	488	29	481	31	461	34	481	26	493	18
Sweden	487	18	506	11	500	17	483	34	497	17	507	9	514	7	516	10
Switzerland	483	19	484	28	492	28	509	14	501	13	499	13	499	13	494	17
Thailand	379	64	393	66	409	60	441	44	421	46	417	40	420	35	431	31
Trinidad and Tobago	—	—	—	—	427	53	—	—	416	47	—	—	—	—	—	—
Tunisia	—	—	—	—	361	68	404	53	404	52	380	50	375	39	—	—
Turkey	456	36	466	40	428	51	475	39	464	39	447	36	441	33	—	—
Ukraine	428	46	466	39	—	—	—	—	—	—	—	—	—	—	—	—
United Arab Emirates	417	48	432	46	434	48	442	42	—	—	—	—	—	—	—	—
United Kingdom	494	13	504	14	498	22	499	21	494	23	495	16	507	10	523	8
United States	504	9	505	13	497	24	498	22	500	16	—	—	495	18	504	15
Uruguay	430	43	427	48	437	46	411	51	426	43	413	41	434	34	—	—
Uzbekistan	336	80	—	—	—	—	—	—	—	—	—	—	—	—	—	—
Vietnam	462	34	—	—	487	32	508	17	—	—	—	—	—	—	—	—

=== Subnational regions ===
Country	Language group	Science	Mathematics	Reading
Italy	German-language schools (South Tyrol)	508	491	481
Italy	Ladin-language schools (South Tyrol)	494	476	473
Italy	Italian-language schools (South Tyrol)	474	459	464

== Reception ==
=== Latin America ===
The UNESCO report PISA 2022: An Overview of Latin American and Caribbean Countries, published in 2024, showed that Latin American and Caribbean countries performed below the OECD average, particularly in mathematics. Chile and Uruguay achieved the region’s strongest mathematics results, ranking 52 and 53 respectively, followed by Mexico (57) and Peru (59). By contrast, Paraguay, the Dominican Republic, El Salvador and Guatemala ranked among the lowest-performing participants. Across the region, approximately 75% of students failed to reach basic proficiency in mathematics, while 55% lacked basic reading proficiency and 57% performed below the basic proficiency threshold in science.

=== Brazil ===
According to the OECD’s PISA 2025 results, Brazil’s students performed below the OECD average in science, mathematics and reading, with results remaining largely unchanged since 2015. Only 28% achieved minimum proficiency in mathematics, 49% in reading and 48% in science. The performance gaps are linked to socioeconomic inequality widened and educational disparities in the country.

=== China ===
China's participation in the 2012 test was limited to Shanghai, Hong Kong, and Macau as separate entities. In 2012, Shanghai participated for the second time, again topping the rankings in all three subjects, as well as improving scores in the subjects compared to the 2009 tests. Shanghai's score of 613 in mathematics was 113 points above the average score, putting the performance of Shanghai pupils about 3 school years ahead of pupils in average countries. Educational experts debated to what degree this result reflected the quality of the general educational system in China, pointing out that Shanghai has greater wealth and better-paid teachers than the rest of China. Hong Kong placed second in reading and science and third in maths.

Andreas Schleicher, PISA division head and co-ordinator, stated that PISA tests administered in rural China have produced some results approaching the OECD average. Citing further as-yet-unpublished OECD research, he said, "We have actually done Pisa in 12 of the provinces in China. Even in some of the very poor areas you get performance close to the OECD average." Schleicher believes that China has also expanded school access and has moved away from learning by rote, performing well in both rote-based and broader assessments.

In 2014, Liz Truss, then the British Parliamentary Under-Secretary of State at the Department for Education, led a fact-finding visit to schools and teacher-training centres in Shanghai. Britain increased exchanges with Chinese teachers and schools to find out how to improve quality. In 2014, 60 teachers from Shanghai were invited to the UK to help share their teaching methods, support pupils who are struggling, and help to train other teachers. In 2016, Britain invited 120 Chinese teachers, planning to adopt Chinese styles of teaching in 8,000 aided schools. By 2019, approximately 5,000 of Britain's 16,000 primary schools had adopted the Shanghai's teaching methods. The performance of British schools in PISA improved after adopting China's teaching styles.

In 2018 the Chinese provinces that participated were Beijing, Shanghai, Jiangsu and Zhejiang. In 2015, the participating provinces were Jiangsu, Guangdong, Beijing, and Shanghai. The 2015 Beijing-Shanghai-Jiangsu-Guangdong cohort scored a median 518 in science in 2015, while the 2012 Shanghai cohort scored a median 580.

Critics of PISA counter that in Shanghai and other Chinese cities, most children of migrant workers can only attend city schools up to the ninth grade, and must return to their parents' hometowns for high school due to hukou restrictions, thus skewing the composition of the city's high school students in favour of wealthier local families. A population chart of Shanghai reproduced in The New York Times shows a steep drop off in the number of 15-year-olds residing there. According to Schleicher, 27% of Shanghai's 15-year-olds are excluded from its school system (and hence from testing). As a result, the percentage of Shanghai's 15-year-olds tested by PISA was 73%, lower than the 89% tested in the US. Following the 2015 testing, OECD published in-depth studies on the education systems of a selected few countries including China.

According to estimates from The Economist in 2026, China would have scored among the highest even if every single province had taken part in the test. For example, the country's math score would have been 536, the fourth highest in the world, while its average score across all three subjects would have been 501, the seventh highest in the world.

=== Finland ===
Finland, which received several top positions in the first tests, fell in all three subjects in 2012, but remained the best performing country overall in Europe, achieving their best result in science with 545 points (5th) and worst in mathematics with 519 (12th) in which the country was outperformed by four other European countries. The drop in mathematics was 25 points since 2003, the last time mathematics was the focus of the tests. For the first time Finnish girls outperformed boys in mathematics narrowly. It was also the first time pupils in Finnish-speaking schools did not perform better than pupils in Swedish-speaking schools. Former minister of Education and Science Krista Kiuru expressed concern for the overall drop, as well as the fact that the number of low-performers had increased from 7% to 12%.

=== India ===
India participated in the 2009 round of testing but pulled out of the 2012 PISA testing, with the Indian government attributing its action to the unfairness of PISA testing to Indian students. India had ranked 72nd out of 73 countries tested in 2009. The Indian Express reported, "The ministry (of education) has concluded that there was a socio-cultural disconnect between the questions and Indian students. The ministry will write to the OECD and drive home the need to factor in India's "socio-cultural milieu". India's participation in the next PISA cycle will hinge on this". The Indian Express also noted that "Considering that over 70 nations participate in PISA, it is uncertain whether an exception would be made for India".

India did not participate in the 2012, 2015 and 2018 PISA rounds.

A Kendriya Vidyalaya Sangathan (KVS) committee as well as a group of secretaries on education constituted by the Prime Minister of India Narendra Modi recommended that India should participate in PISA. Accordingly, in February 2017, the Ministry of Human Resource Development under Prakash Javadekar decided to end the boycott and participate in PISA from 2020. To address the socio-cultural disconnect between the test questions and students, it was reported that the OECD will update some questions. For example, the word avocado in a question may be replaced with a more popular Indian fruit such as mango.

India did not participate in the 2022 PISA rounds citing the COVID-19 pandemic disruption.

=== Malaysia ===
In 2015, the results from Malaysia were found by the OECD to have not met the maximum response rate. Opposition politician Ong Kian Ming said the education ministry tried to oversample high-performing students in rich schools.

=== Mexico ===
President Andrés Manuel López Obrador rejected the 2022 results, which showed a decline compared to those of 2018, saying that "all those metrics were created during the time of the neoliberal era". In his view, these parameters were designed to "eradicate public education by degrading it". Three years later, his successor Claudia Sheinbaum again rejected the results following another decline, stating that "tests for all countries always have their limitations due to each country's unique characteristics", and pointing out that the same thing happened in other OECD countries.

=== Morocco ===
Morocco participated in the 2025 test, ranking 83rd in science, 87th in reading and 80th in mathematics among 91 participating countries. Only 23% of students reached minimum proficiency in science, 16% in mathematics and 13% in reading, compared with OECD averages of 74%, 65% and 69%, respectively.

=== Sweden ===
Sweden's result dropped in all three subjects in the 2012 test, which was a continuation of a trend from 2006 and 2009. It saw the sharpest fall in mathematics performance with a drop in score from 509 in 2003 to 478 in 2012. The score in reading showed a drop from 516 in 2000 to 483 in 2012. The country performed below the OECD average in all three subjects. The leader of the opposition, Social Democrat Stefan Löfven, described the situation as a national crisis. Along with the party's spokesperson on education, Ibrahim Baylan, he pointed to the downward trend in reading as most severe.

In 2020, Swedish newspaper Expressen revealed that Sweden had inflated their score in PISA 2018 by not conforming to OECD standards. According to professor Magnus Henrekson a large number of foreign-born students had not been tested.

=== United Arab Emirates ===
The PISA 2025 results show that the United Arab Emirates (UAE) ranked first among participating Arab countries. UAE students scored 458 points in science, 453 in mathematics and 433 in reading. These scores represent improvements over 2022, with increases of 26 points in science, 21 in mathematics and 15 in reading.

=== United Kingdom ===
In the 2012 test, as in 2009, the result was slightly above average for the United Kingdom, with the science ranking being highest (20). England, Wales, Scotland and Northern Ireland also participated as separated entities, showing the worst result for Wales which in mathematics was 43rd of the 65 countries and economies. Minister of Education in Wales Huw Lewis expressed disappointment in the results, said that there were no "quick fixes", but hoped that several educational reforms that have been implemented in the last few years would give better results in the next round of tests. The United Kingdom had a greater gap between high- and low-scoring students than the average. There was little difference between public and private schools when adjusted for socio-economic background of students. The gender difference in favour of girls was less than in most other countries, as was the difference between natives and immigrants.

Writing in the Daily Telegraph, Ambrose Evans-Pritchard warned against putting too much emphasis on the UK's international ranking, arguing that an overfocus on scholarly performances in East Asia might have contributed to the area's low birthrate, which he argued could harm the economic performance in the future more than a good PISA score would outweigh.

In 2013, the Times Educational Supplement (TES) published an article, "Is PISA Fundamentally Flawed?" by William Stewart, detailing serious critiques of PISA's conceptual foundations and methods advanced by statisticians at major universities.

In the article, Professor Harvey Goldstein of the University of Bristol was quoted as saying that when the OECD tries to rule out questions suspected of bias, it can have the effect of "smoothing out" key differences between countries. "That is leaving out many of the important things," he warned. "They simply don't get commented on. What you are looking at is something that happens to be common. But (is it) worth looking at? PISA results are taken at face value as providing some sort of common standard across countries. But as soon as you begin to unpick it, I think that all falls apart."

Queen's University Belfast mathematician Dr. Hugh Morrison stated that he found the statistical model underlying PISA to contain a fundamental, insoluble mathematical error that renders Pisa rankings "valueless". Goldstein remarked that Dr. Morrison's objection highlights "an important technical issue" if not a "profound conceptual error". However, Goldstein cautioned that PISA has been "used inappropriately", contending that some of the blame for this "lies with PISA itself. I think it tends to say too much for what it can do and it tends not to publicise the negative or the weaker aspects." Professors Morrison and Goldstein expressed dismay at the OECD's response to criticism. Morrison said that when he first published his criticisms of PISA in 2004 and also personally queried several of the OECD's "senior people" about them, his points were met with "absolute silence" and have yet to be addressed. "I was amazed at how unforthcoming they were," he told TES. "That makes me suspicious." "Pisa steadfastly ignored many of these issues," he says. "I am still concerned."

Professor Svend Kreiner, of the University of Copenhagen, agreed: "One of the problems that everybody has with PISA is that they don't want to discuss things with people criticising or asking questions concerning the results. They didn't want to talk to me at all. I am sure it is because they can't defend themselves.

=== United States ===
Since 2012 a few states have participated in the PISA tests as separate entities. Only the 2012 and 2015 results are available on a state basis. Puerto Rico participated in 2015 as a separate US entity as well.

2012 US State results
Mathematics

Massachusetts	514
Connecticut	506
(United States) US Average	481
Florida	467

Science

Massachusetts	527
Connecticut	521
(United States) US Average	497
Florida	485

Reading

Massachusetts	527
Connecticut	521
(United States) US Average	498
Florida	492

2015 US State results
Mathematics

Massachusetts	500
North Carolina	471
(United States) US Average	470
Puerto Rico	378

Science

Massachusetts	529
North Carolina	502
(United States) US Average	496
Puerto Rico	403

Reading

Massachusetts	527
North Carolina	500
(United States) US Average	497
Puerto Rico	410

==== PISA results for the United States by race and ethnicity ====
Mathematics
Race	2022	2018	2015	2012	2009	2006	2003
Race	Score	Score	Score	Score	Score	Score	Score
Asian	543	539	498	549	524	494	506
White	498	503	499	506	515	502	512
US Average	465	478	470	481	487	474	483
More than one race	476	474	475	492	487	482	502
Hispanic	439	452	446	455	453	436	443
Black	412	419	419	421	423	404	417
Other	—	—	423	436	460	446	446

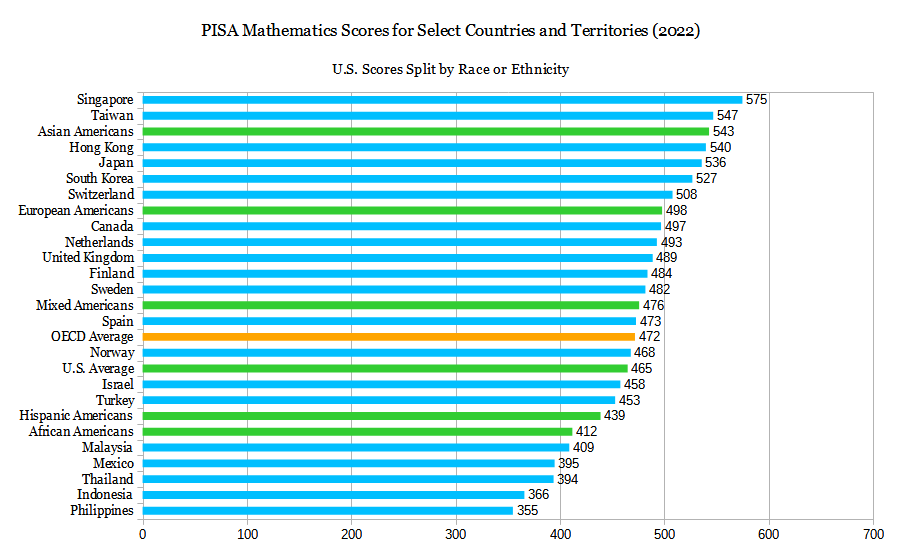

Science
Race	2022	2018	2015	2012	2009	2006
Race	Score	Score	Score	Score	Score	Score
Asian	578	551	525	546	536	499
White	537	529	531	528	532	523
US Average	499	502	496	497	502	489
More than one race	513	502	503	511	503	501
Hispanic	471	478	470	462	464	439
Black	445	440	433	439	435	409
Other	—	—	462	439	465	453

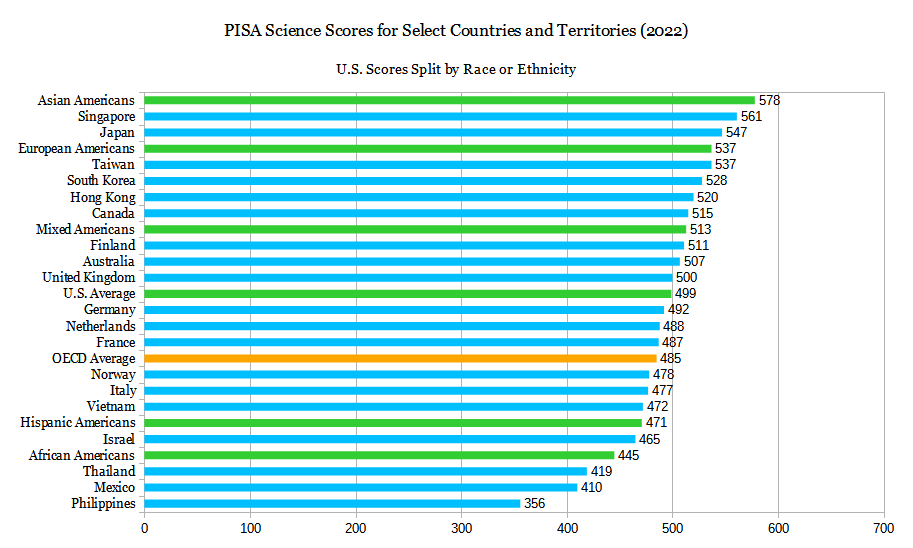

Reading
Race	2022	2018	2015	2012	2009	2006	2003	2000
Race	Score	Score	Score	Score	Score	Score	Score	Score
Asian	579	556	527	550	541	—	513	546
White	537	531	526	519	525	—	525	538
US Average	504	505	497	498	500	—	495	504
More than one race	512	501	498	517	502	—	515	—
Hispanic	481	481	478	478	466	—	453	449
Black	459	448	443	443	441	—	430	445
Other	—	—	440	438	462	—	456	455

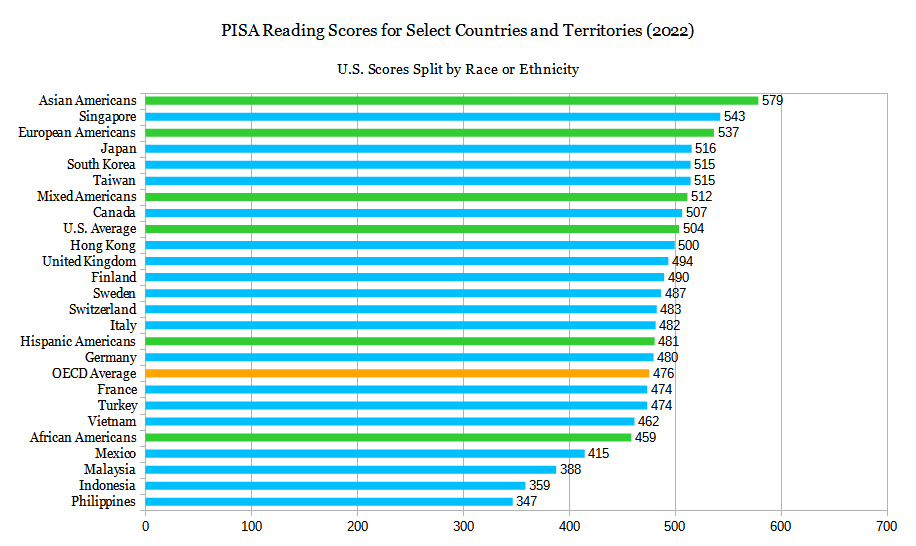

== Research on possible causes of PISA disparities in different countries ==
Although PISA and TIMSS officials and researchers themselves generally refrain from hypothesizing about the large and stable differences in student achievement between countries, since 2000, literature on the differences in PISA and TIMSS results and their possible causes has emerged. Data from PISA have furnished several researchers, notably Eric Hanushek, Ludger Wößmann, Heiner Rindermann, and Stephen J. Ceci, with material for books and articles about the relationship between student achievement and economic development, democratization, and health; as well as the roles of such single educational factors as high-stakes exams, the presence or absence of private schools and the effects and timing of ability tracking.

== Critics and comments on accuracy ==
David Spiegelhalter of Cambridge wrote: "Pisa does present the uncertainty in the scores and ranks - for example the United Kingdom rank in the 65 countries is said to be between 23 and 31. It's unwise for countries to base education policy on their Pisa results, as Germany, Norway and Denmark did after doing badly in 2001."

According to an open letter to Andreas Schleicher, director of PISA, various academics and educators argued that "OECD and Pisa tests are damaging education worldwide".

According to O Estado de São Paulo, Brazil shows a great disparity when classifying the results between public and private schools, where public schools would rank worse than Peru, while private schools would rank better than Finland.

According to a 2023 book, PISA is failing in its mission. It suggests that flatlined student outcomes and policy shortcomings have much to do with PISA's implicit ideological biases, structural impediments such as union advocacy, and conflicts of interest.

== See also ==
- Gender gaps in mathematics and reading in PISA 2009
- Progress in International Reading Literacy Study (PIRLS)
- Programme for the International Assessment of Adult Competencies (PIAAC)
- Teaching And Learning International Survey (TALIS)
- Trends in International Mathematics and Science Study (TIMSS)
