= Talis chamylella =

Scientific classification
- Domain: Eukaryota
- Kingdom: Animalia
- Phylum: Arthropoda
- Class: Insecta
- Order: Lepidoptera
- Family: Crambidae
- Subfamily: Crambinae
- Tribe: Ancylolomiini
- Genus: Talis
- Species: T. chamylella

Binomial name
- Talis chamylella Staudinger, 1899

Synonyms
- Talis chamilella Filipjev & Diakonoff, 1924; Talis chanylella Hua, 2005

Species of moth

Talis chamylella is a moth in the family Crambidae. It is found in the Tian Shan Mountains.
