= Talis afra =

Scientific classification
- Domain: Eukaryota
- Kingdom: Animalia
- Phylum: Arthropoda
- Class: Insecta
- Order: Lepidoptera
- Family: Crambidae
- Subfamily: Crambinae
- Tribe: Ancylolomiini
- Genus: Talis
- Species: T. afra

Binomial name
- Talis afra Bethune-Baker, 1894

Species of moth

Talis afra is a moth in the family Crambidae described by George Thomas Bethune-Baker in 1894. It is found in Egypt and Libya.

The wingspan is about 21 mm.
