= Talis arenella =

Scientific classification
- Domain: Eukaryota
- Kingdom: Animalia
- Phylum: Arthropoda
- Class: Insecta
- Order: Lepidoptera
- Family: Crambidae
- Subfamily: Crambinae
- Tribe: Ancylolomiini
- Genus: Talis
- Species: T. arenella

Binomial name
- Talis arenella Ragonot, 1887

Species of moth

Talis arenella is a moth in the family Crambidae described by Émile Louis Ragonot in 1887. It is found in Tunisia and Algeria.

The wingspan is 28–29 mm.

== Subspecies ==
- Talis arenella arenella
- Talis arenella algirica P. Leraut, 2012 (Algeria)
