= Teaching and Learning International Survey =

The Teaching And Learning International Survey (TALIS) is a worldwide evaluation on the conditions of teaching and learning, performed first in 2008. It is coordinated by the Organisation for Economic Co-operation and Development (OECD), with a view to improving educational policies and outcomes.

== See also ==
- Programme for International Student Assessment (PISA)
- Trends in International Mathematics and Science Study (TIMSS)
