= Talos (disambiguation) =

Talos was a giant bronze automaton in Greek mythology. For other uses in mythology, see Talos (mythology).

Talos may also refer to:

== In fiction ==
- The Talos Principle, a first-person puzzle video game
- Talos, one of the Nine Divines from The Elder Scrolls video game series
- Tale of the Mummy, a 1998 horror film also known as Talos the Mummy
- Talos the Untamed, a character who has opposed the Hulk and other Marvel Comics characters
- Talos (Forgotten Realms), a god in the Forgotten Realms campaign setting for the game Dungeons & Dragons
- Talos (Freedom City), a supervillain in the Freedom City setting for the game Mutants & Masterminds
- Talos IV, a planet in the Star Trek episode "The Cage"
- Dora Talos, a mecha in the Japanese animated series Kyōryū Sentai Zyuranger
- T-ALOS, Tyrant Armored Lethal Organic System, a fictional bio-organic weapon featured in the video game Resident Evil: The Umbrella Chronicles
- A minor character in the Space 1999 episode "The Last Enemy"
- Talos 1, the space station which forms the setting of the 2017 game Prey
- Talos, otherwise known as Gigantus, would feature as a boss in the 2024 video game Dragon's Dogma 2

== Other uses ==
- 5786 Talos, an asteroid of the Apollo group
- Cisco Talos, Cisco's cybersecurity and threat intelligence group
- RIM-8 Talos, a U.S. Navy surface-to-air missile
- TalOS, an operating system
- Talos sampsoni, a Late Cretaceous theropod dinosaur
- Talos Dome, an ice dome in East Antarctica
- Talos (inventor), a mythological Greek inventor
- Talos (musician), Irish musician
- TALOS (uniform), Tactical Assault Light Operator Suit, a US military exoskeleton
