= Talis (moth) =

Scientific classification
- Domain: Eukaryota
- Kingdom: Animalia
- Phylum: Arthropoda
- Class: Insecta
- Order: Lepidoptera
- Family: Crambidae
- Subfamily: Crambinae
- Tribe: Ancylolomiini
- Genus: Talis; Guenée, 1845

Synonyms
- Drasa Kapur, 1950; Prosmixis Zeller, 1846; Tulis Pagenstecher, 1909; Araxates Ragonot in de Joannis & Ragonot, 1889

Genus of moths

Talis is a genus of moths of the family Crambidae described by Achille Guenée in 1845.

== Species ==
- Talis afghanella Błeszyński, 1965
- Talis afra Bethune-Baker, 1894
- Talis arenella Ragonot, 1887
- Talis caboensis Asselbergs, 2009
- Talis cashmirensis (Hampson, 1919)
- Talis chamylella Staudinger, 1899
- Talis cornutella Wang & Sung, 1982
- Talis dilatalis Christoph, 1887
- Talis erenhotica Wang & Sung, 1982
- Talis evidens Kosakjewitsch, 1979
- Talis gigantalis Filipjev & Diakonoff, 1924
- Talis grisescens Filipjev & Diakonoff, 1924
- Talis menetriesi Hampson, 1900
- Talis mongolica Błeszyński, 1965
- Talis pallidalis Hampson, 1900
- Talis povolnyi Roesler, 1975
- Talis pulcherrimus (Staudinger, 1870)
- Talis qinghaiella Wang & Sung, 1982
- Talis quercella (Denis & Schiffermüller, 1775)
- Talis renetae Ganev & Hacker, 1984
- Talis wockei Filipjev, 1929
