= Tallis (name) =

Tallis is the English variation of the ancient name Thales, most notably Thales of Miletus.

Tallis may refer to the following people:

== Given name ==
- Tallis Obed Moses (born c. 1954), President of Vanuatu

== Surname ==
- Canon Tallis, a major character in the young adult novels of Madeleine L'Engle
- Cedric Tallis (1914–1991), American baseball executive
- Gorden Tallis (born 1973), Australian rugby league player
- John Tallis (1817–1876), English cartographic publisher
  - Tallis Directory, is a gazetteer of Gravesend written and published by John
- Nicola Tallis (born 1985), British historian
- Raymond Tallis (born 1946), English geriatrician and intellectual
- Sonja Tallis (born 1943), Australian actress, singer and drama teacher
- Steve Tallis (born 1952), Australian singer-songwriter and guitarist
- Thomas Tallis (1505–85), English composer
  - The Tallis Scholars, British early music ensemble named after the composer
  - Thomas Tallis School in Greenwich, London, England
