= Looking (disambiguation) =

Looking is the act of intentionally focusing visual perception on someone or something.

Looking or The Looking may also refer to:

- Looking (TV series), an American comedy-drama television series
- Looking: The Movie, a comedy-drama movie related to the TV series
- Looking (1981 book), a 1981 children's book about vision by Richard Allington and Kathleen Krull (illustrated by Bill Bober)
- Looking (1986 book), a 1986 children's book about vision by Joy Wilt Berry
- The Looking, an indie pop and Americana band led by Todd Carter

== See also ==
- Look (disambiguation)
