= Villalobos Brothers =

Mexican musical trio

The Villalobos Brothers
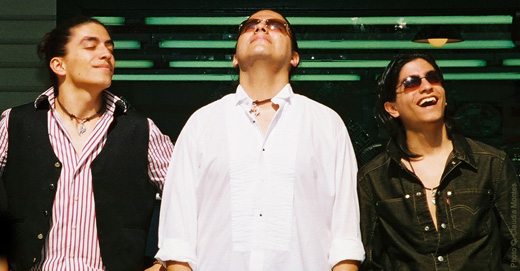
- From left to right: Alberto, Ernesto, and Luis Villalobos before a performance at The Festival of Nations; Tennessee, April 2008.

Background information
- Origin: Veracruz, Mexico
- Genres: World, Classical, Son Jarocho, Son Huasteco, Mexican folk, Latin jazz, Latin pop
- Years active: 2005–present
- Members: Ernesto Villalobos; Alberto Villalobos; Luis Villalobos; Backing band: Beto Flores, Samuel Zabaleta, Jorge Espinoza, Oscar Rosales
- Website: VillalobosBrothers.com

The Villalobos Brothers are a Mexican trio of violinists, singer-songwriters, composers, and multi- instrumentalists. They have performed at the Latin Grammy Awards, Carnegie Hall, the Solomon R. Guggenheim Museum, the Metropolitan Museum of Art, the 60th Anniversary of the United Nations, the Rainbow Room at Rockefeller Center, the New York Mets field at Shea Stadium, and other historic venues.

The Villalobos Brothers have accompanied and collaborated with many international artists, including Morley, Paloma San Basilio, Paddy Moloney and The Chieftains, Eddie Palmieri, Graciela, Dolly Parton, León Gieco, Leni Stern, César Camargo Mariano, Lila Downs, Richie Ray & Bobby Cruz, Pierre Boulez, Alberto Vázquez, Johnny Ventura, Dan Zanes and Rafael Escalona. Their first solo album, Villa-Lobos, was released in 2009.

== Early years and education ==
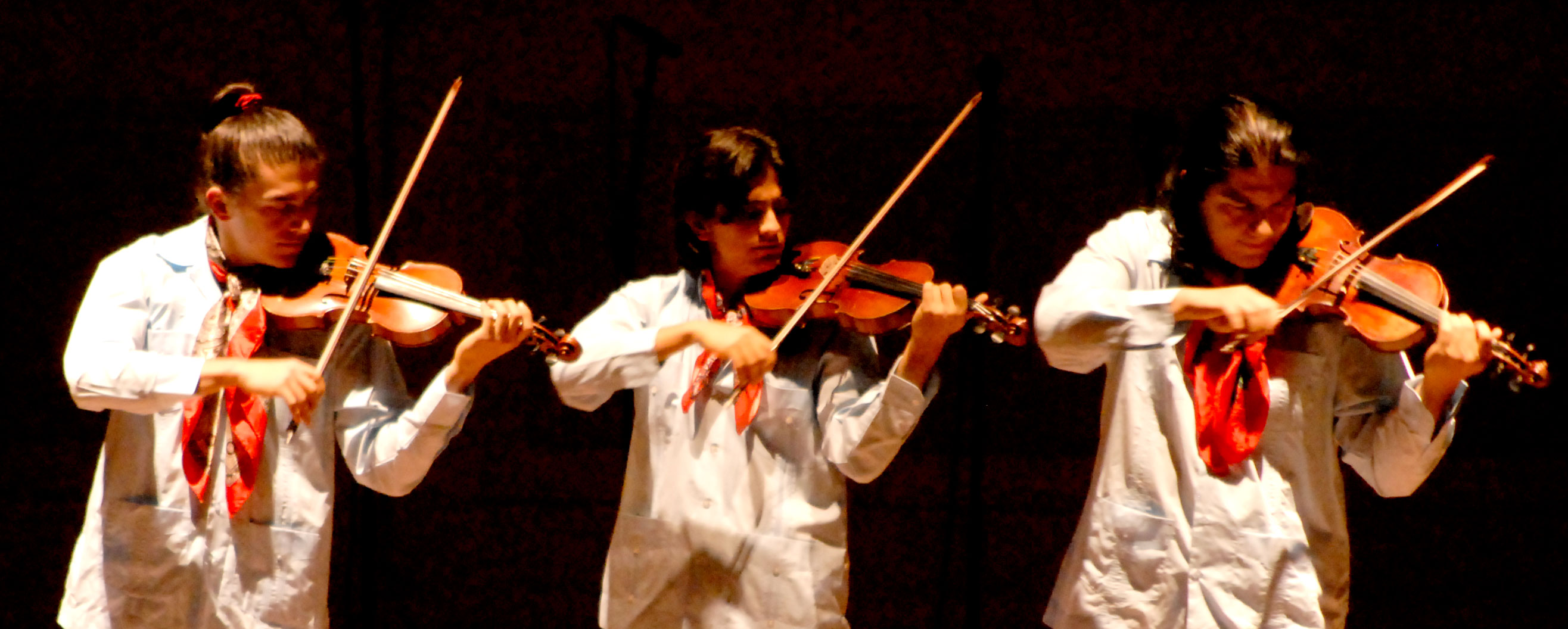
The Villalobos Brothers performing at Carnegie Hall's Isaac Stern Auditorium

=== Early years ===
Ernesto, Alberto, and Luis Villalobos were born and raised in Xalapa, Mexico, an hour away from the port city of Veracruz. They spent their childhood listening to their grandmother play music for enjoyment after the work day, accompanying dancers at a country fandango, or playing for guests dining in restaurants. The trio learned the violin at a young age and soon learned to sing and play other instruments, including the guitar, the piano and the jarana. They eventually moved on to specialize in classical violin and composition, which further developed into the creation of their own style of playing called "Fast-Chatting Violin" which involves a rapid succession of notes and percussive sounds that imitate the human voice.

From 1990 to 2000 they studied classical violin with Carlos Marrufo Gurrutia, and composition and counterpoint with Eugeniusz Sleziak Kandora, Roberto Lira López, and Ryszard Siwy Machalica.

The Villalobos Brothers were considered child prodigies and had early soloist debuts with the Xalapa Symphony Orchestra playing the Sibelius, Brahms, and Saint-Saëns violin concertos. They also had solo appearances with the National Symphony Orchestra of Cuba, and the National Symphony Orchestra of Peru.

=== Advanced musical studies ===
In 2000, the U.S. Department of State awarded the eldest brother, Ernesto, a Fulbright Grant to carry out graduate studies at the Manhattan School of Music. In 2001 he performed at Master Classes led by Pinchas Zukerman and Glenn Dicterow and travelled to Israel to study with Shlomo Mintz.

The middle brother, Alberto, left Mexico in 2002 and studied violin with Igor Oistrakh at the Royal Conservatory of Brussels for three years. He was later selected as a student by Pierre Boulez at the Lucerne Festival Academy in Switzerland.

In 2003 the youngest brother, Luis, moved to Germany, where he studied violin with Nicolas Chumachenco at the Hochschule für Musik Freiburg. He was also accepted at the Mozarteum University of Salzburg in Austria.

== Style and influences ==
Although the three Villalobos Brothers are classically trained on the violin, their music draws influence from many genres, including Son jarocho (a musical style from their native city of Veracruz). Jarocho describes the unique style as being created by the people and culture of the southern coastal plain of Veracruz, who for more than two centuries have shaped a distinctive regional music which intertwines fundamentals of jazz, rock and blues.

Most of their original music features complex patterns of interwoven three-violin harmonies, intricate call-and-response arrangements, and lyrical melodies carried out by one of the brothers as the other two reinforce it in counterpoint.

== Carnegie Hall concerts ==
=== Joan and Sanford I. Weill Recital Hall ===
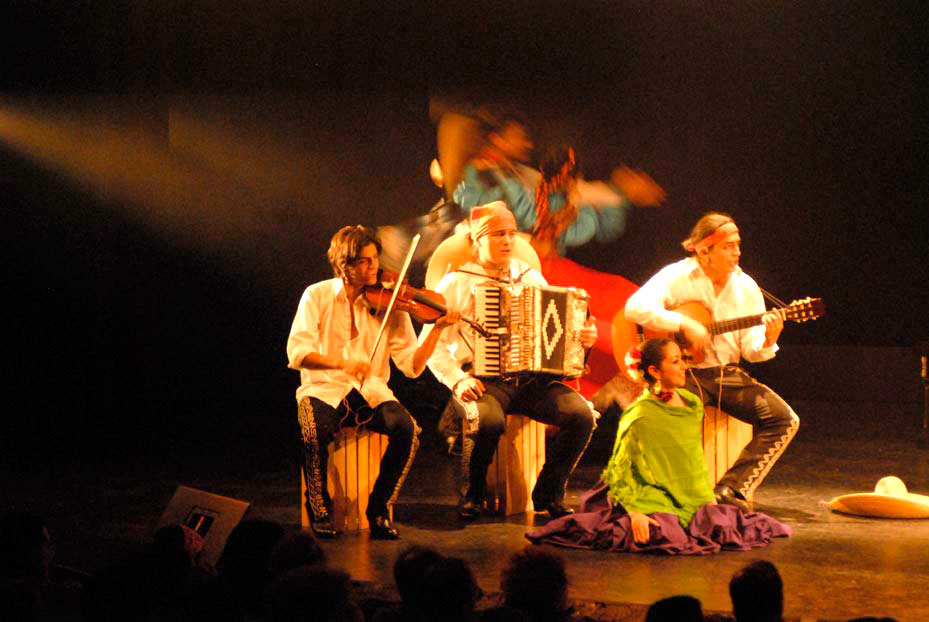
The Villalobos Brothers performing at Queens Theatre in the Park

On 23 October 2005, the Villalobos Brothers reunited in New York City for their debut recital at Carnegie Hall. The concert was also a sold-out benefit for The Shul of New York.

=== Isaac Stern Auditorium / Ronald O. Perelman Stage ===
On 17 December 2006, the Villalobos Brothers were invited back to Carnegie Hall, this time leading the music program for Calpulli Mexican Dance Company's production at the Isaac Stern Auditorium involving over a hundred dancers and musicians and with the special participation of the Mariachi Academy of New York. For this concert, the brothers premiered several original compositions, including "Anochipa Tlalticpac" for chorus, jaranas, and pre-Columbian percussion.

== Collaboration with Calpulli Mexican Dance Company ==
From 2006 to 2009, Ernesto served as musical director of Calpulli Mexican Dance Company. During these years, the Villalobos Brothers toured extensively with the company, including performing with Dolly Parton at the Festival of Nations at Dollywood.

== Latin Grammy Appearance ==
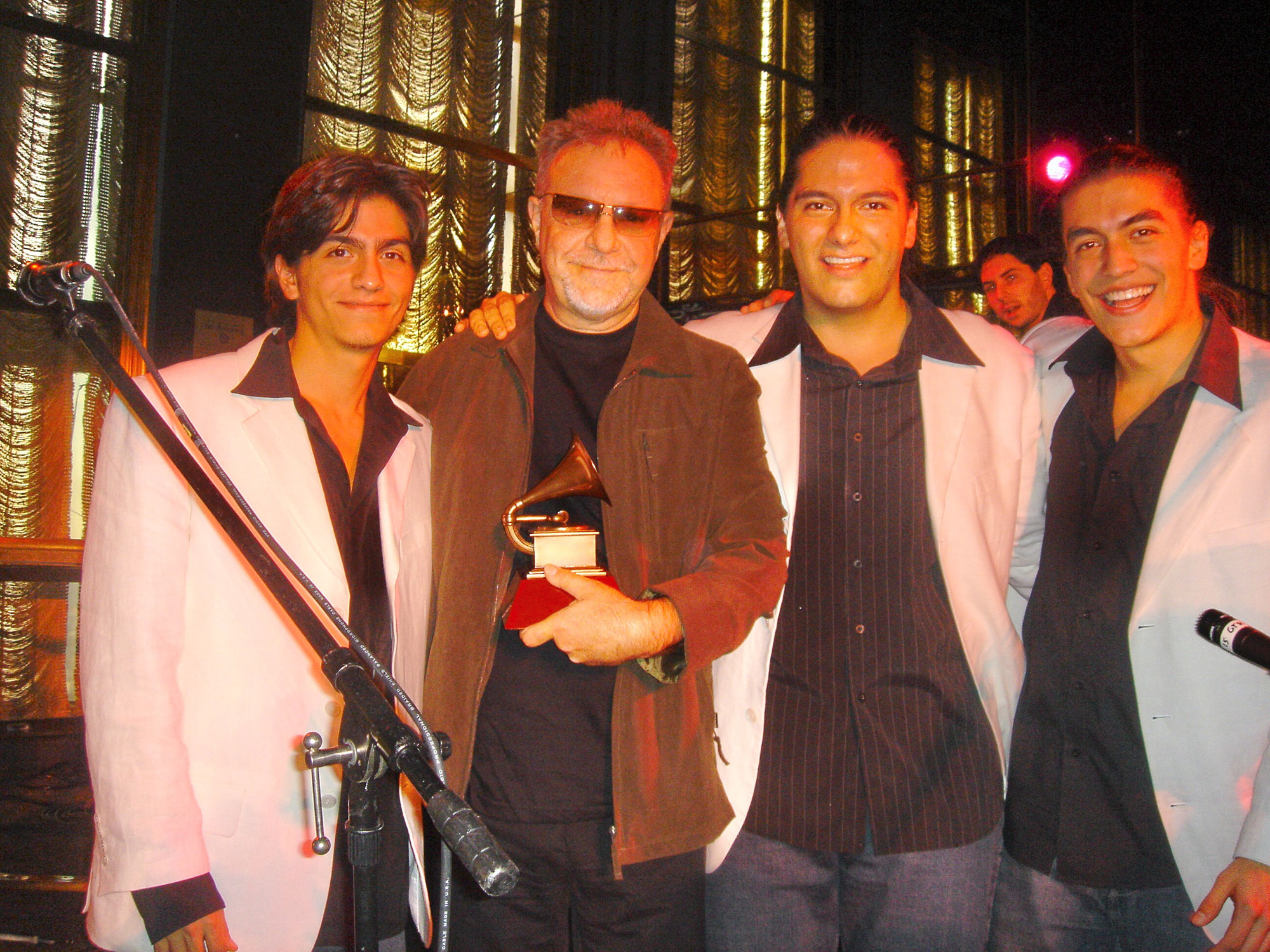
The Villalobos Brothers with León Gieco after the Latin Grammy Awards in New York City

The Villalobos Brothers appeared at The 7th Annual Latin Grammy Awards. They arranged and performed the music of Grammy winners Graciela, Paloma San Basilio, León Gieco, César Camargo Mariano, Richie Ray & Bobby Cruz, Alberto Vázquez, Johnny Ventura and Rafael Escalona.

== Other performances and collaborations ==
=== Town Hall Theater ===
On 30 November 2004, Ernesto Villalobos gave a soloist performance at The Town Hall Theater in Manhattan. This performance was the world premiere of La Promesa del Guerrero, a symphonic piece written and performed by Ernesto featuring tenor Mauricio O'Reilly. This 20-minute composition was based on a poem by Mane de la Parra. It narrates the Nahua legend of the Popocatépetl and Iztaccíhuatl mountains outside Mexico City. The concert marked the closing night of the 2004 Celebrate MexicoNOW! Festival organized by Claudia Norman.

=== The Shul Band: Auschwitz-Birkenau Concentration Camps ===
The Villalobos Brothers have been frequent collaborators of The Shul Band, a klezmer band led by Adam Feder. In 2005 Ernesto Villalobos and Adam Feder led a candlelit vigil at the children's barracks inside the Auschwitz-Birkenau Memorial and Museum as part of Bernie Glassman's Bearing Witness Zen Peacemakers retreat 2005 in Oświęcim, Poland.

=== Collaboration with Dan Zanes ===
On 17 January 2008, The Villalobos Brothers accompanied Grammy-winner Dan Zanes as part of Blue Country Heart: The Music of Hank Williams in a concert at Kaufman Center's Merkin Concert Hall in New York City.

Later that year, they also toured the West Coast of the US as part of the show Holiday House Party With Dan Zanes and Friends, ending with a three-week residency at the New Victory Theater on Broadway. As part of the tour, the Villalobos Brothers played and sang holiday music from their native Veracruz.

=== National Dance Institute ===
In June 2008, the Villalobos Brothers were featured as soloists at the National Dance Institute's Event of the Year "Volando a México". This series of concerts involved over 200 dancers and musicians and told the story of two Mexican-American children living in New York City who fly to Mexico for the first time. As part of this same event, they were also invited to appear in a short film by NDI's Artistic Director Jacques d'Amboise, The Children of the Roses.

== Critical reception and awards ==
=== Critical reception ===
The Villalobos Brothers have been acclaimed as violin virtuosos and one of the leading ensembles of world music. Following a 12 November 2006, concert at Kaufman Center's Merkin Concert Hall in New York City, The Forward noted that "...they played with exuberant intensity for the appreciative audience...Ernesto returned his attention to his violin, his long, dark hair flying through the air as his bow raced across the strings....With their heads bowed as if in prayer, their fingers jumping and feet tapping, they weren't just playing music, they were living it."

In 2007, they received the Tepeyac Association of New York's "Leaders of the Future Excellence Award".

=== Awards ===
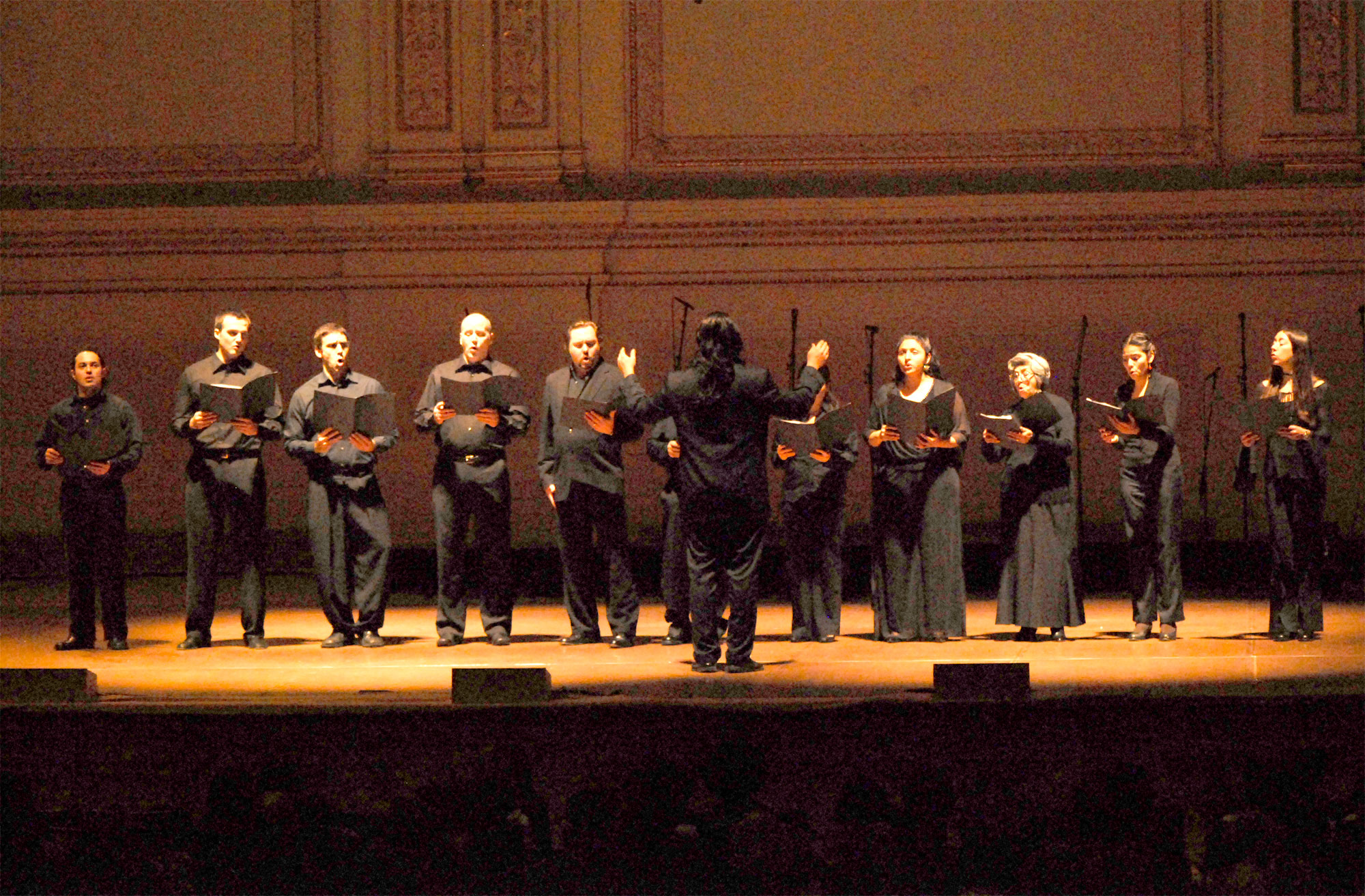
Ernesto Villalobos conducts the premiere of "Anochipa Tlalticpac" at Carnegie Hall

- 2011 – Bronze Medal for Best Documentary in the category of Social Issues at the New York Festivals International Radio Competition
- 2007 – Leaders of the Future Award presented by the Tepeyac Association of New York
- 2003 – Beca para Ejecutantes Fondo Nacional para la Cultura y las Artes FONCA (National Fund for Culture and Arts of Mexico)
- 2000 – Fulbright Grant awarded to Ernesto Villalobos by the U.S. Department of State
- 1999 – National Medal in Music awarded by the President of Mexico, Ernesto Zedillo Ponce de León
- 1997 – Gold Medal at the Fifth National Violin Competition
- 1995 – TELMEX Foundation Grant sponsored by business magnate and philanthropist Carlos Slim Helú

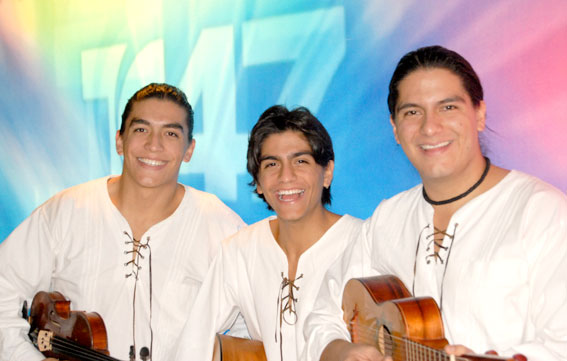
4The Villalobos Brothers after a performance on Telemundo 47

== Discography ==
=== Solo ===
- Villa-Lobos, 2009

=== Collaborations ===
- Eddie Palmieri, Ritmo Caliente, 2003
- The Shul Band, Alive at the Shul of New York, 2004
- Lilly Lavner, Walking Away, 2004
- Rene Hubbard, Chicavasco, 2005
- The Looking, Tin Can Head, 2005
- Vivian Farmery, Places, 2006
- Rick Martinez at IMDb Soundtrack: Viva la Vida, 2006
- Leni Stern, Love Comes Quietly, 2006
- Morley, Days Like These, 2006
- The Shul Band, Instrumental, 2007
- Dan Zanes, Nueva York!, 2008
- The Chieftains featuring Ry Cooder, San Patricio, 2010 (appear with Lila Downs)
- Hope Harris, Cousins Jamboree, 2010

== Movies and documentaries ==
=== Original soundtracks ===
- Oscar Frasser, El Águila Negra, Original soundtrack composed by Luis Villalobos featuring tenor Román García, 2011 (compositions, arrangements, appear on), CUNY Short Films
- United Nations Radio, Gender Equality And 15 Year-Olds, Original soundtrack composed by Ernesto Villalobos featuring soprano Claudia Bianca Montes, 2010 (compositions, arrangements, appear on), United Nations Radio Unit, New York
- Caitlin McEwan, Moving Pictures, featuring Caitlin Fitzgerald at IMDb, Original soundtrack composed by Alberto Villalobos, 2009 (compositions, arrangements, appear on), 12 Weeks 12 Films

=== Instrumentals ===
- Richard Temtchine, a film writer and director, How to Seduce Difficult Women, Original soundtrack by Pedro da Silva, 2009 (appear on), Quadrant Entertainment
- Javier Chapa at IMDb, Harvest of Redemption, Original soundtrack by Richard Martinez 2007 (appear on), Chapa-Perez Entertainment
- Juan Fischer at IMDb Buscando a Miguel, Original soundtrack by Sebastián Cruz, 2007 (appear on), Hidden Eye Productions
- John J. Valadez and Cristina Ibarra, The Last Conquistador, Original soundtrack by Richard Martinez, 2007 (appear on), PBS Point of View

== Plays ==
- Zona Rosa a play by Carlos Morton directed by Michael Barakiva. Music performed by The Villalobos Brothers at Queens Theatre in the Park 14 May 2011
- Desert Fathers a play by Paavo Tom Tammi at IMDb directed by Jenny Sullivan. Original music by Jerry Korman and The Villalobos Brothers.
- The Roses on the Rocks a play by Ellen Boscov, directed by Richard Caliban. Original music by Rana Santacruz, performed by Alberto Villalobos
- Viva La Vida a play by Diane Shaffer directed by Susana Tubert. Original music by Rick Martinez at IMDb Soundtrack: Viva la Vida, 2006 (appear on), Bay Street
