= Susan B. Neuman =

American educator and researcher

- Born: United States
- Occupations: Educator, researcher

Susan B. Neuman is an American educator, researcher, and education policy-maker in early childhood and literacy development. In 2013, she became Professor of Early Childhood and Literacy Education, and Chair of the Department of Teaching and Learning at NYU's Steinhardt School of Culture, Education, and Human Development.

Neuman previously served as Assistant Secretary of Elementary and Secondary Education in the United States Department of Education during the George W. Bush Administration and was primarily responsible for initial implementation of the No Child Left Behind Act. Neuman has written or edited 12 books and has written more than 100 peer-reviewed articles on topics such as media literacy, early childhood literacy education and curriculum, family literacy, parent education, and education policy. She has been co-editor of the Journal of Literacy Research, and serves on several editorial boards, including Reading Research Quarterly, Reading Teacher, and Journal of Literacy Research. Neuman has directed or been actively involved with numerous early literacy research organizations and state and national projects. She has received many awards and honors for her research and public service. Neuman's most recent professional endeavors have been directed towards improving the quality of early childhood education services in disadvantaged communities and promoting principles of educational initiatives to help children living in poverty.

== Education ==
Neuman graduated from American University in Washington, DC with a BA in religion and philosophy in 1968. She earned her teaching certification in 1969 from University of California, Berkeley. In 1974, Neuman received an MA in Reading Supervision and Administration from California State University, Hayward and an EdD from the University of the Pacific (United States) in Stockton, California in 1977. Neuman was recently awarded an honorary doctoral degree from California State University, Hayward in 2002.

== Career ==
=== California/Connecticut ===
After receiving her BA and teacher certification, Neuman began her professional career in California as a first grade teacher. She later worked as a Title I reading teacher and resource teacher while earning her MA in Reading Supervision and Administration from California State University, Hayward. After receiving her doctorate in education from University of the Pacific in Stockton, California, Neuman taught and conducted research as an associate professor from 1979 to 1986 at Eastern Connecticut State University in Willimantic, Connecticut. During this time, she also taught as visiting faculty at Yale University in New Haven, CT.

=== Massachusetts ===
From 1984 to 1986, Neuman was a Senior Research Associate for the Educational Development Center (EDC) in Newton, Massachusetts. EDC is a nonprofit organization that designs, delivers and evaluates innovative programs to address urgent challenges in education, health and economic opportunity. While at EDC, Neuman worked on a US Department of Education field-based project focused on the use of microcomputers to facilitate writing development in learning disabled children. She also taught and conducted research as an associate professor at University of Massachusetts Lowell from 1984 to 1990.

=== Philadelphia ===
In 1990, Susan Neuman became an associate professor of Curriculum, Instruction and Technology in Education and Coordinator of the Reading and Language Arts Graduate Program at Temple University in Philadelphia, PA. Her research agenda addressed numerous issues in early literacy and childhood education, including effective instructional practices, literacy as a cultural tool in play, family literacy, and parent education. In addition, Neuman worked with the William Penn Foundation in Philadelphia, as well as the Philadelphia Public Library system to implement and evaluate projects aimed at improving access to books/media in disadvantaged communities (see section on Major Topics of Research below).

=== Michigan ===
In 2000, Neuman joined the College of Education faculty at University of Michigan at Ann Arbor as Professor of Educational Studies. There, she also served as Director of Dissemination and National Leadership for the Center for the Improvement of Early Reading Achievement (CIERA), succeeding Elfrieda "Freddy" Hiebert as the director, an educational research organization funded through the US Department of Education. Headquartered at the University of Michigan, CIERA was a consortium of university researchers, teacher educators, teachers, publishers of texts, tests, and technology, professional organizations, schools and school districts across the United States. CIERA's mission was "to improve the reading achievement of America's children by generating and disseminating theoretical, empirical, and practical solutions to persistent problems in the learning and teaching of beginning reading." As director, Neuman worked to bring CIERA's message to a broad range of audiences in education, government and policymaking.

=== Washington, DC ===
Neuman took a two-year hiatus from her professorship at University of Michigan when she was named US Assistant Secretary for Elementary and Secondary Education in 2001 by President George W. Bush. In her role as US Assistant Secretary, Neuman managed the Office of Elementary and Secondary Education, served as the principal adviser to the secretary of education on all matters related to elementary and secondary education, and initiated implementation of the No Child Left Behind Act. As US Assistant Secretary, Neuman was primarily responsible for directing, coordinating and recommending policy and funding for programs designed to assist state and local agencies to improve achievement of students K to 12. A primary focus of this office is to expand educational opportunities and excellence for all children, particularly those who are educationally or economically disadvantaged, and to increase school accountability for students’ educational progress nationwide.

Neuman held this office from 2001 to 2003, during which time she established the Reading First program and the Early Reading First program, and was responsible for all activities in Title I of the Elementary and Secondary Education Act. During her tenure with the US Department of Education, Neuman also established the Early Childhood Professional Development Education Program. The purpose of this program is to promote young children's school readiness and learning outcomes by providing high quality, professional development for early childhood educators and caregivers working in poverty-stricken communities. In 2003, Neuman resigned from her position as US Assistant Secretary and returned to academic life as a professor and researcher. She was a visiting professor at University of Georgetown at the Center on Health and Education, an organization that focused on ways to help realize health equity and achieve educational excellence worldwide.

=== Michigan ===
Later in 2003, Susan Neuman returned to her position at University of Michigan to teach and conduct research as a full-time Professor of Educational Studies. Dr. Neuman's current projects include evaluation of the Every Child Ready to Read, a program designed to provide public libraries with vital tools to help prepare parents for their critical role as their child's first teacher. She is also involved with the University of Michigan Ready to Learn Project. This project focuses on developing and assessing scientifically based literacy curricula for use in early childhood (pre-K and K) classrooms, online education for teachers and care providers, and resources for parents and families.

== Major topics of research ==
=== Media and literacy ===
The role of media and language/literacy development has been an early and ongoing topic of Susan Neuman's research. During the 1980s, Neuman conducted several studies that explored the impact of television on listening, reading achievement and attitudes, as well as specific reading skills such as inferencing, comprehension, and vocabulary acquisition through exposure to captioned text. In the midst of hot debates on the impact of television viewing on reading, Neuman challenged the traditional assumptions regarding the negative relationship between TV and literacy development. In two editions of her book, Literacy in the Television Age: The Myth of the T.V. Effect, Neuman systematically reviewed the developing corpus of research on the relationship between television media and literacy. She concluded that the relationship was complex and like other resources, television was neither "intrinsically" good nor bad. Neuman characterized television viewing as a situated social practice embedded within family life and as such, needed to be carefully examined within the context of a child's environment. Moreover, the role of adult mediators in that environment was a critical determinant of television media's positive or negative impact.

Neuman urged those who would "banish" new technologies and media, to shift focus toward harnessing the power of this media for positive educational purposes. As a powerful disseminator of information, TV contributes to public knowledge and our understanding of social and political current events. Neuman noted that TV is a prime medium for expanding children's background knowledge and exposure to story genres. Access to information from television, radio and other media sources can potentially foster students’ interests in different topics that can foster literacy development. Encounters with multiple perspectives through media can support critical thinking when interacting with other texts. Rather than being in competition, Neuman maintained that the entertainment and educational purposes of television may have a complementary, synergistic relationship for enhancing children's literacy and learning.

Neuman applied this theory of synergy between media and learning to other early literacy projects and research over the course of her career. She has incorporated multimedia resources and technologies into preschool and professional development curricula to provide a "360 degree surround" of information for early childhood education programs. In Multimedia and Literacy Development: Improving Achievement for Young Readers, Neuman and co-editor Adriana Bus, provided an updated synthesis of evidence-based research that documents young readers’ experiences with evolving multimedia materials. This research suggests how new features of media might enhance children's ability to understand stories and gain in independent reading.

=== Access to books and media resources ===
Neuman saw the potential for newly evolving media as means to support young children's literacy development and close the knowledge-gap for disadvantaged students with limited opportunities for enriched experiences. However, rapidly expanding technology along with limited access to both technology-based and traditional print resources threatens to further widen the knowledge divide for many of these children. While at Temple University, Neuman and research associate, Donna Celano, conducted a study that revealed the drastic inequities in available print resources for children in four different Philadelphia communities. Children in low-income areas were dependent on public institutions for access to print, yet libraries in these areas offered impoverished physical resources and limited access to books and technology as compared with libraries in more affluent areas. Similarly, day-care centers that served disadvantaged communities provided a caring environment for children, but were lacking in print-rich materials and staff expertise in early literacy development.

Neuman engaged in several local projects and research initiatives aimed at increasing access to print and technology in disadvantaged communities of Philadelphia. Two major projects were funded by the William Penn Foundation of Philadelphia. The Books Aloud project flooded 350 child-care centers with books and provided training for child-care staff on techniques for enhancing children's literacy environment and interactions with books. Enhanced physical access to books, greater verbal interactions around literacy, and more time spent engaged in book-related activities resulted in significant gains in print-related concepts and school readiness of children involved with the Books Aloud program.

A second project involved a major renovation of libraries in the Philadelphia library system to establish technologized urban libraries that offered neighborhoods across the city with state-of-the-art books, media and facilities, as well as staff training. While increased access to print and media made a significant difference in the literate lives of children and families in those Philadelphia communities, Neuman observed that increased resources alone were not enough to "level the playing field", and close the knowledge and media divide for low-income students. A follow-up study conducted by Neuman and Celano five-years later revealed continued, significant differences in how children from different communities used the enriched facilities and accessed media and technology. Children in middle-income communities made far more effective use of library resources for literacy and learning compared to low-income children, as a result of parent support and instruction. By contrast, disadvantaged youngsters without such support made far less effective use of available resources. Neuman and Celano's research highlights the critical role of adult mediation in students’ successful access to the tools of literacy and knowledge acquisition. During hard economic times, Neuman warns against prioritizing capital outlays for technology over budgeted salaries for qualified library staff. In their supportive interactions with youngsters, trained librarians and media specialists make a critical difference in students’ ability to effectively access both traditional texts and media for literacy and learning.

Neuman's Ready to Read Research Team continues to collaborate with the Public Library Association and the Association for Library Services for Children to enhance family literacy and children's as part of the Every Child Ready initiative. This program is designed to provide public libraries with essential tools to help prepare parents for their most important role as their child's first teacher. This focus on developing skills of early childhood professionals and families in support of children's literacy development and learning has also been a hallmark of Neuman's ongoing research.

=== Best practices in early childhood literacy and education ===
Best practice in early childhood literacy and education has been a predominant theme throughout Dr. Neuman's career and research. In collaboration with early childhood researcher, Kathleen Roskos, Neuman has conducted numerous studies and written articles, chapters and books on topics such as the role of play in preschoolers’ literacy learning, enhancing early literacy classroom environments as authentic contexts for reading and writing, developmentally appropriate practice, family literacy interactions and parent education. While at Temple University, Neuman co-authored a position paper that was jointly issued by the International Reading Association and the National Association for the Education of Young Children (NAEYC)entitled, Learning to Read and Write: Developmentally Appropriate Practices for Young Children. This paper established literacy goals for early childhood programs and outlined what parents and teachers could do to help children in preschool through second grade successfully develop reading and writing skills.

Concerned with the achievement and knowledge-gap between low and middle/upper income children evident even during the early years of life, Neuman has been a strong proponent of intensive, content-rich preschool instruction that fosters essential links between vocabulary/language, concepts, and content area learning. Neuman states that within content-rich settings, "early literacy skills serve children's developing thirst for knowledge and greater understanding." While emphasizing the importance of literacy and content area goals for early childhood programs, Neuman insists that national and state educational reform initiatives need to encourage school readiness through developmentally appropriate practices. Neuman warns that "nonsensical" skill-and-drill approaches to learning focus on a small set of procedural skills within activities disconnected from the real purposes of literacy. As architects of the foundations for later learning, early childhood educators need to provide at-risk children with a "great infusion of knowledge" developed through words, meanings and a network of concepts that connect them to real world experiences. Neuman argues that if we are to close the achievement gap for at-risk children in the US, educators and policymakers must be committed to creating intensive, high-quality programs anchored in best practice for early childhood education

=== Changing the odds: Breaking the cycle of poverty ===
Susan Neuman stated that the major lesson she learned from her experiences as administrator of the NCLB was, "Poverty trumps all". She observed that in the face of overwhelming disadvantages of children living in poverty, extensive school-based educational reforms can only hope to marginally close the achievement gap for these youngsters. In her two books, Changing the Odds for Children At Risk and Educating the Other America, she advocated for a "broader, bolder approach" to comprehensive reform that encompasses not only education, but coordinated social and health services for children and families living in poverty-stricken communities. Neuman derived essential principles for this approach from an extensive review of highly effective programs that were consistently "changing the odds" for young, at-risk children. Effective programs target children and families who evidence multiple-risk factors associated with poverty and provide early intervention efforts during the preschool years. Services need to "invest in two generations at a time", both parents and child, and coordinate delivery of critical health, education and social services across disciplines so that children arrive at school healthy and able to learn. Neuman further argues that intensive, compensatory services need to be provided by highly trained professionals with an eye toward accountability and continuous monitoring children's progress and program improvement. Neuman insists that only through this "broader, bolder approach" can we break the cycle of poverty so that at-risk children can learn, achieve and succeed.

Neuman's ongoing research focuses on designing preschool curricula and professional development programmes for early childhood education in disadvantaged communities..

== Awards and honors ==
- 2003 Distinguished Alumni Award for Public Service, University of the Pacific, Stockton, CA
- 2003 Named by Choice magazine, "Outstanding Academic Titles for 2002: Handbook on Early Literacy Research - II.Edited by S. B. Neuman & D. K. Dickinson. NY: Guilford Press, 2003.
- 2002 Honorary Doctorate, California State University, Hayward
- 2000–2003 Elected to Board of Directions, International Reading Association
- 2001 Recipient of Dina Feitelson Research Award, International Reading Association
- 2002 Early Childhood Educator of the Year, Delaware Valley Child Care Association & Philadelphia Child Care Matters
- 2001 Appointed Assistant Secretary for Elementary and Secondary Education by President George W. Bush
- 1995 Barbara Bush Foundation for Family Literacy Award
- 1994 Award for Editorship of the Journal of Reading Behavior, National Reading Conference
- 1994 Award for Outstanding Research in Human Development Research, American Educational Research Association (co-recipient with Kathleen Roskos)
- 1991 Award from the Elva Knight Foundation, International Reading Association
- 1989 Outstanding Research Award, Eastern Connecticut State University
