= Eunice Askov =

American literary scholar

Eunice skov
- Born: Eunice Nicholson Askov

Academic background
- Education: University of Wisconsin-Madison

Academic work
- Discipline: Literary
- Institutions: Pennsylvania State University

Eunice Nicholson Askov is an American literary scholar focusing on adult and family literacy, currently a Distinguished Professor Emerita of Education at Pennsylvania State University. She received her PhD from the University of Wisconsin-Madison in 1969. She is an honorary affiliate of the International Reading Association and a 2007 inductee into the International Adult and Continuing Education Hall of Fame.
