= Dina Feitelson Research Award =

- Awarded for: An outstanding empirical study published in English in a refereed journal
- Presented by: International Reading Association
- First award: 1997
- Website: https://www.literacyworldwide.org/get-involved/awards-recognition/awards-grants/ila-dina-feitelson-research-award

The Dina Feitelson Research Award is an award established in 1997 by the International Reading Association to honor the memory of Dina Feitelson, the Israeli educator, who died in 1992.

== Criteria for award ==
The award recognizes an outstanding empirical study published in English in a refereed journal. The work should report on one or more aspects of literacy acquisition, such as phonemic awareness, the alphabetic principle, bilingualism, or cross-cultural studies of beginning reading.

Works may be submitted by the author or anyone else.

== List of recipients ==
Year	Recipients	Works
1997	Darlene M. Tangel Benita A. Blachman	“Effect of Phoneme Awareness Instruction on the Invented Spelling of First-Grade Children: A One-Year Follow-Up”, Journal of Reading Behavior (vol. 27, no. 2)
1998	Peter J. Hatcher Charles Hulme Andrew W. Ellis	“Ameliorating Early Reading Failure by Integrating the Teaching of Reading and Phonological Skills: The Phonological Linkage Hypothesis”, Child Development (vol. 65, no. 1)
1999	William E. Tunmer James W. Chapman	“A Longitudinal Study of Beginning Reading Achievement and Reading Self-Concept”, British Journal of Educational Psychology (vol. 67, no. 3)
2000	Jill Fitzgerald George W. Noblit	“About Hopes, Aspirations, and Uncertainty: First-Grade English-Language Learners’ Emergent Reading”, Journal of Literacy Research (vol. 31, no. 2)
2001	Susan B. Neuman	“Books Make a Difference: A Study of Access to Literacy”, Reading Research Quarterly (vol. 34, no. 3)
2002	Nell K. Duke	“3.6 Minutes Per Day: The Scarcity of Informational Texts in First Grade”, Reading Research Quarterly (vol. 35, no. 2)
2003	Barbara A. Wasik Mary Alice Bond	“Beyond the Pages of a Book: Interactive Book Reading and Language Development in Preschool Classrooms”, Journal of Educational Psychology (vol. 93, no. 2)
2004	Anne McGill Franzen Ellen Adams Cynthia Lanford	“Learning to be Literate: A Comparison of Five Urban Early Childhood Programs”, Journal of Educational Psychology (vol. 94, no. 3)
2005	Darrell Morris Janet W. Bloodgood Richard G. Lomax Jan Perney	“Developmental Steps in Learning to Read: A Longitudinal Study in Kindergarten and First Grade”, Reading Research Quarterly (vol. 38, no. 3)
2006	Carol McDonald Connor Frederick J. Morrison Leslie E. Katch	“Beyond the Reading Wars: Exploring the Effect of Child-Instruction Interactions on Growth in Early Reading”, Scientific Studies of Reading (vol. 8, no. 4))
2007	Terrence Tivnanto Lowry Hemphill	“Comparing Four Literacy Reform Models in High-Poverty Stricken Schools: Patterns of First-Grade Achievement”, The Elementary School Journal (vol. 105, no. 5)
2008	Pia Rebello Britto Jeanne Brooks-Gunn Terri M. Griffin	“Maternal Reading and Teaching Patterns: Associations With School Readiness in Low-Income African American Families”, Reading Research Quarterly (vol. 41, no. 1)
2009	Catherine F. Compton-Lilly	“The Complexities of Reading Capital in Two Puerto Rican Families”, Reading Research Quarterly (vol. 42, no. 1)
2010	Deborah Wells Rowe	"The Social Construction of Intentionality: Two-Year-Olds’ and Adults’ Participation at a Preschool Writing Center", Research in the Teaching of English (vol. 42, no. 4)
2011	Lisa Hammett Price Anne van Kleec Carl J. Huberty	"Talk During Book Sharing Between Parents and Preschool Children: A Comparison Between Storybook and Expository Book Conditions", Reading Research Quarterly (Vol. 44, No 2)
2012	Sheila W. Valencia Antony T. Smith Anne M. Reece Min Li Karen K. Wixson Heather Newman	"Oral Reading Fluency Assessment: Issues of Construct, Criterion, and Consequential Validity", Reading Research Quarterly (Vol. 4)
2013	Michael J. Kieffer	"Converging Trajectories: Reading Growth in Language Minority Learners and Their Classmates, Kindergarten to Grade 8", American Educational Research Journal (Vol. 48 No. 5)
2014	Shayne B. Piasta Yaacov Petscher Laura Justice	"How many letters should preschoolers in public programs know? The diagnostic efficiency of various preschool letter-naming benchmarks for predicting first-grade literacy achievement", Journal of Educational Psychology (Vol. 104 No. 4)
2015	Lori E. Skibbe Samantha W. Bindman Annemarie H. Hindman Dorit Aram Frederick J. Morrison	"Longitudinal relations between parental writing support and preschoolers' language and literacy skills", Reading Research Quarterly (Vol. 48 No. 4)
2016	Susan Hopewell Kathy Escamilla	"Struggling Reader or Emerging Biliterate Student? Reevaluating the Criteria for Labeling Emerging Bilingual Students as Low Achieving", Journal of Literacy Research (Vol. 46 No. 1)
2017	Lea M. McGee Hwewon Kim Kathryn S. Nelson Mary D. Fried	"Change Over Time in First Graders' Strategic Use of Information at Point of Difficulty in Reading", Reading Research Quarterly (Vol. 50 No. 3)
2018	Maren Aukerman Lorien Chambers Schuldt	"The Pictures Can Say More Things: Change Across Time in Young Children’s References to Images and Words During Text Discussion", Reading Research Quarterly (Vol. 51 No. 3)
2019	Dani Kachorsky Lindsey Moses Frank Serafini Megan Hoelting	"Meaning Making With Picturebooks: Young Children's Use of Semiotic Resources", Literacy Research and Instruction (Vol. 56 No. 3)
2022	Seung-Hee Claire Son Kirsten R. Butcher Lauren Aimonette Liang	"The Influence of Interactive Features in Storybook Apps on Children’s Reading Comprehension and Story Enjoyment", The Elementary School Journal (Vol. 120 No. 3)
2022	Mary-Claire Ball Erin Curran Fabrice Tanoh Hermann Akpé Shakhlo Nematova Kaja K. Jasińska	"Learning to Read in Environments With High Risk of Illiteracy: The Role of Bilingualism and Bilingual Education in Supporting Reading", Journal of Educational Psychology (Vol. 114 No. 5)
2023	Marianne Rice Florina Erbeli Christopher G. Thompson Mary Rose Sallese Melissa Fogarty	"Phonemic Awareness: A Meta-Analysis for Planning Effective Instruction", Reading Research Quarterly (Vol. 57 No. 4)
2024	Amber Lawson	"We Can Draw and Think About It Ourselves: Putting Culture and Race in Phonics Instruction", Reading Research Quarterly (vol. 59 No. 1)
2025	Jackie E. Relyea James S. Kim Patrick Rich Jill Fitzgerald	"Effects of Tier 1 Content Literacy Intervention on Early-Grade English Learners’ Reading and Writing: Exploring the Mediating Roles of Domain-Specific Vocabulary and Oral Language Proficiency", Journal of Educational Psychology (vol. 116 No. 7)
2026	Amy C. Crosson Michael J. Kieffer Margaret G. McKeown William Nagy	"Cross-Language Morphological Analysis Improves Academic Word Learning for Multilingual Adolescents", Scientific Studies of Reading (vol. 29 no. 1)
