= Feitelson =

Feitelson is a surname. Notable people with the surname include:

- Dina Feitelson (1926–1992), Israeli educator and scholar
  - Dina Feitelson Research Award
- Lorser Feitelson (1898–1978), American painter
