= Orders, decorations, and medals of Laos =

System of honors and awards of Laos

Orders, decorations, and medals of Laos comprise the historical and contemporary honorific systems used to reward civil and military merit in Laos.

== Laos PDR (1975–present) ==
=== Titles ===
- Hero of the Lao People's Democratic Republic

=== Orders ===
Ribbon	Name	Notes
	National Gold Medal	The highest state honor, instituted in 1981. It is awarded to the President of Laos, prominent citizens, and foreign heads of state.
	Order of Freedom (Classes I, II, III)	Awarded for outstanding achievements in national defense and social development. Initially established in 1955 as the Medal of Freedom.
	Order of Victory (Classes I, II, III)	Primarily a military decoration for successful combat leadership or strategic planning.
	Order of Labour (Classes I, II, III)	Awarded to individuals and organizations for high productivity and innovations in national economy.
	Order of Friendship	
	Order of Development (Classes I, II, III)	Awarded for infrastructure development, education, and public health achievements.

== Kingdom of Laos (1909–1975) ==
=== Royal Orders ===
Ribbon	Name	Established	Criteria
	Order of the Million Elephants and the White Parasol	1 May 1909	Awarded in five classes for exceptional civil and military service.
	Order of the Crown of Laos	1950	Awarded in four classes for meritorious services rendered to the Crown.
	Order of the Reign	1927	Awarded to civil servants.

=== Royal Military and Civil Medals ===
- Medal of Military Valour: Instituted in 1957.
- Order of Civic Merit: Awarded for exceptional administrative and community service.
- Medal for Agricultural Merit: Instituted to reward developments in farming and forestry.

== See also ==
- Orders, decorations, and medals of Vietnam
- Orders, decorations, and medals of Cambodia
