= Elfrieda "Freddy" Hiebert =

Elfrieda "Freddy" Hiebert (born 1948) is an educational researcher whose work examines literacy, learning, early childhood development, teacher development, writing and children's literature. The main thrust of her work addresses literacy learning among at-risk youth in American classrooms. Currently, she is the CEO and president of TextProject, Inc., an agency that is dedicated to bringing beginning and struggling readers to high levels of literacy through a variety of strategies and tools, particularly through using science and social studies texts, used for reading instruction.

== Biography ==
Elfrieda "Freddy" H. Hiebert received her B.A. in history from Fresno Pacific College, her M.Ed. in Elementary Education from the University of Illinois at Urbana–Champaign, and her Ph.D. in Educational Psychology from the University of Wisconsin–Madison. She started her career as a classroom teacher for the Clovis (CA) Unified School District before entering graduate school. From 1979 to 1985, she was on the faculty of the University of Kentucky. During her tenure at the University of Kentucky, she spent a year as a visiting associate professor at the Center for the Study of Reading at the University of Illinois at Urbana–Champaign (1984) where she served as the director of staff for Becoming a Nation of Readers: The Report of the Commission on Reading which, in 1985, was published under the auspices of the Center for the Study of Reading and the National Academy of Education. In 1987, she assumed a professorship at the University of Colorado Boulder and, in 1994, moved to the University of Michigan. From 1997 to 1999, she directed the Center for Improvement of Early Reading Achievement (CIERA) at the University of Michigan that included researchers Susan B. Neuman and Nell K. Duke as well as others from Michigan State University, University of Virginia, University of Southern California, and the University of Minnesota. From 2005 to 2010, she was an adjunct professor at the University of California, Berkeley. In January 2011, she founded and became CEO/president of TextProject, Inc.

Among the awards that Hiebert has received in recognition of her contributions as a researcher and educator are the School of Education Alumni Achievement Award from the University of Wisconsin–Madison (2000), William S. Gray Citation of Merit award for outstanding contributions to the field of reading from the International Reading Association (2008), election to the Reading Hall of Fame (2008), and selection as a Fellow of the American Educational Research Association (2011).

== Research and contributions to educational practice ==
Hiebert has authored or edited 11 books, including the influential report, Becoming a Nation of Readers, and published over 150 articles in archival journals or chapters in academic volumes. The primary focus of her work has been on identifying text features that support reading development among beginning and struggling readers. She has also contributed to related literatures, particularly on how knowledge of vocabulary influences students' learning from text. Hiebert has recently addressed the issues of how words should be selected for explicit instruction in reading and how word selection differs for narrative compared to informational texts.

A strand of Hiebert's recent work explores students' facility in applying word recognition skills while reading texts silently. As a result, Hiebert has suggested that "comprehension-based silent reading rate" (or CBSRR) is a critical concept requiring attention from both researchers and instructors.

== Research on text complexity and the TExT model ==
The main focus of Hiebert's research is identifying appropriate texts for struggling and beginning readers. Beginning with Becoming a Nation of Readers, Hiebert has been a proponent of alternative models of text difficulty. She has advocated alternatives to conventional readability formulas as well as current updated versions such as lexiles. Hiebert has written extensively about the failure of typical procedures for establishing text difficulty to recognize how the decodability of a word can inflate a text's difficulty. Similarly, she has noted that conventional readability formulas penalize texts that have sufficient repetition for readers to develop automaticity in word recognition and pronunciation.

As an alternative to current procedures for establishing text difficulty, Hiebert has proposed the Text Elements by Task (TExT) Model . This model evaluates text difficulty by examining two text features that research has shown to have an influence on word recognition among beginning and struggling readers. The features are: (a) the linguistic content of the words in the text (i.e., the letter-sound patterns within the words and the relative frequency of the words in written English), and (b) the cognitive load placed on the reader in processing the linguistic content.

== TextProject.org and TextProject, Inc ==
Hiebert has sustained a career-long commitment to furthering strong and evidence-based reading instruction. In Becoming a Nation of Readers, Hiebert and her coauthors (Richard C. Anderson, Judith A. Scott and Ian A.G. Wilkerson) found a wide audience and had a substantial effect on national policy and practice. As director of CIERA, she was responsible for Every child a reader, a summary of research on effective beginning reading practices. TextProject, Inc.supports struggling and beginning readers by providing (a) books and book lists that are indexed by reading level, (b) lessons for teachers and tutors to use with their students, and (c) analytical reports for teacher educators, school board members, and other decision-makers on the research underlying reading programs and policies.

== Selected works ==
=== Books ===
- Hiebert, E.H., & Reutzel, R. (Eds.) (2010). Revisiting silent reading: New directions for teachers and researchers. Newark, DE. IRA.
- Hiebert, E.H. (Ed.) (2009). Reading more, reading better: Solving problems in the teaching of literacy. New York: Guilford.
- Hiebert, E.H., & Sailors, M. (Eds.) (2008). Finding the right texts for beginning and struggling readers: Research-based solutions. New York: Guilford.
- Hiebert, E.H., & Raphael, T.E. (1998). Early literacy instruction. Fort Worth: Harcourt Brace College Publishing.
- Hiebert, E.H. (Ed.) (1991). Literacy for a diverse society: Perspectives, practices, and policies. New York: Teachers' College Press.

=== Chapters in books ===
- Hiebert, E.H., & Cervetti, G.N. (in press). What differences in narrative and informational texts mean for learning and instruction of vocabulary. In J. Baumann and E. Kame'enui (Eds.), Vocabulary instruction: Research to practice (2nd Ed.). New York: Guilford Press.
- Hiebert, E.H. (in press). Texts for beginning readers: The search for optimal scaffolds. In C. Conrad & R. Serlin (Eds.), The Sage handbook for research in education: Pursuing ideas as the keynote of exemplary inquiry. Thousand Oaks, CA: Sage Publications.

=== Journal articles ===
- Brenner, D., & Hiebert, E.H. (2010). If I follow the teacher's edition, isn't that enough? Analyzing reading volume in six core reading programs. Elementary School Journal, 110(3), 347–363.
- Hiebert, E.H., & Fisher, C.W. (2007). The critical word factor in texts for beginning readers. Journal of Educational Research, 101(1), 3–11.
- Hiebert, E.H., & Fisher, C. W. (2005). A review of the national reading panel's studies on fluency: On the role of text. Elementary School Journal, 105, 443–460.
- Hiebert, E.H. (2000). National literacy strategies from an international perspective. Journal of Research in Reading, 23, 308–313.
