= Richard Lomax =

Richard G. Lomax (born September 30, 1954) is a tenured professor of education at the School of Educational Policy and Leadership and the College of Education and Human Ecology at Ohio State University. His research interests include multivariate analysis, models of literacy acquisition, structural equation models, graphics, and statistics in sports.

== Background ==
Lomax was born in Philadelphia, Pennsylvania. He received a BS in psychology from St. Joseph’s College (Pennsylvania) in 1976, an MA and PhD in educational research methodology from the University of Pittsburgh in 1980, and an MEd in elementary education from Boston College in 1995. He has taught at University of Illinois, University of Pittsburgh, LSU, Boston College, University of Alabama, Northern Illinois University, Tallinn University, Tallinn Pedagogical University, and Ohio State University.

== Awards and grants ==
Lomax served twice as a Fulbright Scholar. In 2005 he served as a Fulbright Senior Specialist Scholar at Tallinn University at the Department of Psychology. In 2003–2004 he served as a Fulbright Scholar, Lecturing Award at Tallinn Pedagogical University at the Department of Psychology. He has also received several research, teaching, and book awards including the Dina Feitelson Research Award from the International Reading Association, the Excellence in Teaching Award from LSU, and the Choice Book Award. Lomax has also served as a statistical consultant on numerous projects such as NSF, NIMH, FIPSE, and Corporation for Public Broadcasting. In 2010 he was named fellow of the American Educational Research Association.

== Publications ==
Lomax is the author of the following books: An Introduction to Statistical Concepts for Educational and Behavioral Sciences, Statistical Concepts: A Second Course for Education and the Behavioral Sciences, and A Beginner’s Guide to Structural Equation Modeling (co-authored with R. E. Schumacker). He has also published numerous articles and book chapters in publications including the International Journal of Sports Medicine, Reading Research Quarterly, and Understanding Statistics: Statistical Issues in Psychology.

== Career ==
Currently Lomax is the Associate Dean of Research and Graduate Studies at The Ohio State University and continues to teach a reduced number of statistics courses.
