= Carol McDonald Connor =

Educational psychologist

- Occupation: Educational psychologist
- Awards: Presidential Early Career Award for Scientists and Engineers

Academic background
- Education: University of Michigan, Ann Arbor; Northwestern University
- Thesis: Preschool children and teachers talking together: The influence of child, family, teacher, and classroom characteristics on children's developing literacy (2002)
- Doctoral advisor: Holly K. Craig

Carol McDonald Connor (February 21, 1953 – May 14, 2020) was an educational psychologist known for her research contributions to the field of early literacy development in diverse learners, in particular for work on individualized student instruction interventions and the lattice model of reading development. She held the position of Chancellor's Faculty and Equity Advisor in the School of Education at the University of California, Irvine.

Connor was the editor of The Cognitive Development of Reading and Reading Comprehension (2016), a text on theories of reading comprehension development. She also co-edited Advances in Reading Interventions: Research to Practice to Research (2015) and co-authored Improving Literacy in America: Guidelines from Research (Current Perspectives in Psychology) (2005).

== Biography ==
Carol McDonald was born on February 21, 1953, in Chicago. She began her career in speech-language pathology. After receiving B.S. and M.S. degrees in Speech-Language Pathology from Northwestern University, she spent over ten years working as an ASHA certified speech-language pathologist in Utah, Massachusetts, and Illinois.

In the early 90s, she accepted a position as a speech-language pathologist at the Cochlear Implant Program University of Michigan Medical Center, where she spent five years working with deaf children with cochlear implants. In a 2018 interview with UC Irvine's Dean Richard Arum, Connor cites her experience at the Michigan Medical Center in her transition to literacy research, as she became interested in the reading gap between hearing children and deaf children with implants.

She received her PhD in language, Literacy, and Culture from the University of Michigan, Ann Arbor in 2002, under the supervision of Holly K. Craig. She did her post-doctoral work with Frederick J. Morrison at the University of Michigan.

Since 2002, Connor worked as a research scientist and professor around the country, including at the University of California, Irvine, Arizona State University, Florida State University, and the University of Michigan, Ann Arbor.

She was married to Jay Connor, who is the founder and CEO of a company that uses Connor's Assessment-to-instruction (A2i) software. They have three children. Connor died May 14, 2020, of ovarian cancer.

== Research ==
=== Individualized Student Instruction and Child-by-Instruction Interaction Effects ===
Much of Connor's research has been fostered by a conviction that individual differences matter when it comes to reading instruction.

In 2004, Connor was the Principal Investigator of a three-year grant from the Institute of Education Sciences (IES) to develop the Individualized Student Instruction (ISI) intervention system, which includes the A2i software. The intervention combines teacher training with professional development focused on designing targeted, individualized instruction, typically delivered to small groups of students with similar learning needs.

The A2i software assists teachers in developing individualized instructional plans by providing specific recommendations on the type and amount of instruction required, based on assessment data collected multiple times throughout the school year. The software uses algorithms that draw on child-by-instruction interaction effects identified in Connor’s research, whereby the effectiveness of particular instructional approaches varies depending on each student’s current skill level.

Randomized control studies showed that reading outcomes in ISI classrooms were significantly better than those in control classrooms, in Kindergarten through third grade. Connor was also the principal investigator on several follow-up grants on the project, including a four-year grant to make A2i software accessible to educators in more contexts and without extensive and ongoing researcher support.

=== The Lattice Model of Reading Comprehension ===
Connor borrowed the concept of a Lattice Model from the field of Economics and applied it to the development of reading comprehension. Her model describes the process of learning to understand reading as nonlinear, wherein "language, literacy, cognitive, social, and other environmental factors" develop in a mutual feedback process over time. The model incorporates several previous models of reading comprehension and child development with the addition of child-instruction interaction effects, putting together numerous child characteristics and home- and classroom-characteristics that interact as a system over time. She developed and applied this model during her time working on the Florida State University team of the IES Reading for Understanding Research Initiative with Principal Investigator Christopher J. Lonigan.

=== Recent work ===
In 2017, Connor received a four-year IES grant to develop electronic-books intended to provide adaptive support to improve reading comprehension, including strategies such as word learning, question generation, and summarization. She was the project's Principal Investigator, with co-investigator Danielle McNamara.

Connor was also the Principal Investigator of the Assessment Team of the Early Learning Research Network, which seeks to develop tools and policies that positively impact early learning outcomes through third grade. Connor's team is developing a technology-supported classroom observation system, the Optimizing Learning Opportunities for Students (OLOS) Early Learning Observation System. The Network describes it as "an innovative, multidimensional assessment system" that will "generate reports to match effective recommended instructional practices with observed learning opportunities." The work is supported by a five-year grant from the IES that began in 2016.

== Awards and distinctions ==
In 2006, the IES awarded Connor with the Presidential Early Career Award for Scientists and Engineers (PECASE, 2006) for "innovative research in the development and evaluation of an instructional tool to improve literacy instruction" for her research on individualized student instruction interventions.

In 2007, the American Psychological Association (APA) awarded Connor with the Richard Snow Award for "significant contributions to the field of educational psychology."

Connor was named a 2015 fellow of the American Education Research Association (AERA) and a 2016 fellow of the APA.

Other awards include:

- Innovators Award, Florida State University (2013)
- Developing Scholar, Florida State University (2010)
- Early Career Contribution Award, Society for Research in Child Development (2009)
- Dina Feitelson Research Award from the International Literacy Association for her paper Beyond the Reading Wars: the effect of classroom instruction by child interactions on early reading (2006)

== Representative publications ==
- Connor, C.M., Alberto, P.A., Compton, D.L., O'Connor, R.E. (2014). Improving reading outcomes for students with or at risk for reading disabilities: A synthesis of the contributions from the Institute of Education Sciences Research Centers (NCSER 2014–3000). Washington, DC: National Center for Special Education Research, Institute of Education Sciences, U.S. Department of Education.
- Connor, C.M., & Craig, H.K. (2006). African American preschoolers' language, emergent literacy skills, and use of African American English: A complex relation. Journal of Speech, Language, and Hearing Research, 49, 771–792.
- Connor, C.M., Craig, H.K., Raudenbush, S.W., Heavner, K., & Zwolan, T.A. (2006). The age at which young deaf children receive cochlear implants and their vocabulary and speech-production growth: Is there an added value for early implantation? Ear & Hearing, 27(6), 628–644
- Connor, C.M., Piasta, S.B., Fishman, B., Glasney, S., Schatschneider, C., Crowe, E., Underwood, P., & Morrison, F.J. (2009). Individualizing student instruction precisely: effects of Child x Instruction interactions on first graders' literacy development. Child Development, 80(1), 77–100.
- Connor, C.M., Son, S.-H., Hindman, A.H., and Morrison, F.J. (2005). Teacher Qualifications, Classroom Practices, Family Characteristics, and Preschool Experience: Complex Effects on First Graders' Vocabulary and Early Reading Outcomes. Journal of School Psychology, 43, 343–375.
