= Look =

To look is to use sight to perceive an object.

Look or The Look may refer to:

== Businesses and products ==
- Look (modeling agency), an Israeli modeling agency
- Look (American magazine), a defunct general-interest magazine
- Look (UK magazine), a defunct fashion and celebrity magazine
- Look (cigarette), a Danish brand
- Look!, a candy bar made by Annabelle Candy Company
- Look (company), a French bicycle components and frames

== Film and television ==
- The Look, a 2003 American film starring Teresa Hill
- Look (2007 film), an American drama by Adam Rifkin
  - Look: The Series, an American television drama series, also by Adam Rifkin, related to the film
- Look (2009 film), an American avant-garde short film directed by Ryan Pickett
- "The Look", an episode of American television sitcom Home Improvement

== Music ==
- Look (Beth Nielsen Chapman album)
- Look (EP), by Apink (2020)
- "Look (Song for Children)", a song by The Beach Boys
- The Look (album), an album by Shalamar
- The Look (band), a UK pop band
- "The Look", a song by Roxette
- "The Look", a song by Metronomy from the album The English Riviera
- "Look", a song by Run On from the album No Way

== Other uses ==
- Look (surname)
- The Look: Adventures In Rock & Pop Fashion, a book by Paul Gorman
- LOOK algorithm, in computers
- The concept of Gaze in critical theory, sometimes called "the look"
  - Described in the 1943 book Being and Nothingness by Jean-Paul Sartre
- "The Look", Lauren Bacall's effect when pressing her chin against her chest and to face the camera, tilting her eyes upward

== See also ==
- Appearance (disambiguation)
- Look Look Look, a 2006 album by MC Hammer
- Look Up (disambiguation)
- Looking (disambiguation)
- Lookism, discriminatory treatment toward people considered physically unattractive
