= Journal of Adolescent & Adult Literacy =

- Discipline: Education, literacy
- Language: English
- Edited by: Judith Franzak, Koomi Kim, and Heather Porter

Publication details
- History: 1957-present
- Publisher: Wiley-Blackwell on behalf of the International Literacy Association
- Frequency: Bimonthly
- Impact factor: 0.728 (2011)

Standard abbreviations
- ISO 4: J. Adolesc. Adult Lit.

Indexing
- CODEN: JADLFI
- ISSN: 1081-3004 (print); 1936-2706 (web)
- LCCN: 95659119
- JSTOR: 10813004

Links
- Journal homepage; Online access; Online archive

The Journal of Adolescent & Adult Literacy is a peer-reviewed academic journal published six times per year by Wiley-Blackwell. The current editors are Journal of Adolescent & Adult Literacy is currently edited by Judith Franzak, Koomi Kim, and Heather Porter (Vols. 65–68) of Salisbury University. The journal is one of three journals published on behalf of the International Literacy Association. The journal covers "practical, classroom-tested ideas grounded in research and theory." The Journal of Adolescent & Adult Literacy was first printed under the title Journal of Developmental Reading in 1957, but the name was changed to the Journal of Reading (ISSN 0022-4103) in 1964 starting with Volume 8. The name was changed again in 1995 to the current title.

According to the Journal Citation Reports, the journal has a 2011 impact factor of 0.728, ranking it 102nd out of 203 journals in the category "Education & Educational Research".
