= Alpha Upsilon Alpha =

American honor society for language arts

- ΑΥΑ
- Founded: May 1985; 41 years ago Newark, Delaware
- Type: Honor
- Affiliation: International Literacy Association
- Status: Active
- Emphasis: Reading and language arts
- Scope: National
- Motto: Lege sapere aude "Read, dare to be wise."
- Colors: Gold and Silver
- Publication: Literacy Today; Reading Research Quarterly Journal
- Chapters: 19
- Headquarters: c/o International Literacy Association; PO Box 8139; Newark, Delaware 19714-8139; United States
- Website: Alpha Upsilon Alpha at ILA

Alpha Upsilon Alpha Honor Society (or ΑΥΑ) is an academic honor society recognizing excellence in reading and language arts at the undergraduate and graduate level. Founded in 1985, it is governed by the International Literacy Association.

== History ==
In 1985, delegates to the assembly of the International Reading Association (now International Literacy Association) agreed to form Alpha Upsilon Alpha. Its first seven chapters were approved a year later at the International Reading Association's convention in April 1986. The first chapter was chartered at the University of Northern Iowa.

Alpha Upsilon Alpha was established as an honor society that recognizes excellence in reading and language arts by undergraduate and graduate students. It also develops personal and professional leadership skills, promotes literacy and encourages community service related to reading.

It is governed by the International Literacy Association which is headquartered in Newark, Delawrare.

== Symbols ==
The Greek letters Alpha Upsilon Alpha were selected to stand for Anagnosis (reading), Upotrophia (scholarship), and Archon (leadership).

Alpha Upsilon Alpha's motto is Lege sapere aude which translates as "Read, dare to be wise." Its colors are gold and silver. Members may wear honor cords that are gold and silver at graduation.

== Membership ==
Current logo of ΑΥΑ

There are five categories of membership in Alpha Upsilon Alpha: undergraduate, graduate, faculty, professional, and honorary. Members are selected for their scholarship, leadership, and service in reading.

Undergraduate members must have finished five semesters or 76 credit hours and be in the top 25 percent of their class. Graduate members must be majoring in reading or language arts and have finished at least nine credit hours with a 3.5 GPA or higher.

Faculty members need to be active in reading or the language arts as an academic subject and either have a doctoral degree or meet the graduate-level membership GPA requirement during their Master's degree work. Professional members, such as elementary and secondary school teachers, must meet the requirements for members based on their level of education. Chapters can also select honorary members.

== Chapters ==
Following is an incomplete list of Alpha Upsilon Alpha chapters, with active chapters in bold and inactive chapters and institutions are in italics.

Chapter	Charter date	Institution	Location	Status	Ref.
Alpha	1986	University of Northern Iowa	Cedar Falls, Iowa	Inactive	
Beta	1986			Inactive	
Gamma	1986	Iowa State University	Ames, Iowa	Inactive	
Delta	June 1986	New Jersey City University	Jersey City, New Jersey	Inactive	
**Epsilon**	1986	West Chester University	West Chester, Pennsylvania	Active	
Zeta	1986	Saint Xavier University	Chicago, Illinois	Inactive	
**Eta**	1986	Murray State University	Murray, Kentucky	Active	
Iota		University of West Alabama	Livingston, Alabama	Inactive	
Mu	June 1987	Western Illinois University	Macomb, Illinois	Inactive	
Xi		University of Georgia	Athens, Georgia	Inactive	
Omicron		Boston College	Chestnut Hill, Massachusetts	Inactive	
**Pi**		Loyola University Chicago	Chicago, Illinois	Active	
Rho		Chicago State University	Chicago, Illinois	Inactive	
Tau		Roosevelt University	Chicago, Illinois	Inactive	
	March 1, 1988	Eastern Kentucky University	Richmond, Kentucky	Inactive	
Alpha Alpha		Manhattan College	The Bronx, New York City, New York	Inactive	
Alpha Beta		Dowling College	Oakdale, New York	Inactive	(Note: The college closed in 2016.)
**Alpha Gamma**		Georgia State University	Atlanta, Georgia	Active	
Alpha Delta		Northern Illinois University	DeKalb, Illinois	Inactive	
**Alpha Zeta**		Saint Joseph's University	Philadelphia, Pennsylvania	Active	
Alpha Eta		University of Nebraska Omaha	Omaha, Nebraska	Inactive	
Alpha Theta		University of Wisconsin–Whitewater	Whitewater, Wisconsin	Inactive	
**Alpha Iota**		Buffalo State University	Buffalo, New York	Active	
Alpha Kappa	1992	Purdue University	West Lafayette, Indiana	Inactive	
Alpha Lambda		Troy University at Dothan	Dothan, Alabama	Inactive	
Alpha Mu		Winona State University Rochester Center	Rochester, Minnesota	Inactive	
Alpha Xi		Providence College	Providence, Rhode Island	Inactive	
Alpha Pi (First)	1994	Framingham State University	Framingham, Massachusetts	Inactive	
**Alpha Pi (Second)**		Bridgewater State University	Bridgewater, Massachusetts	Active	
**Alpha Sigma**		Fayetteville State University	Fayetteville, North Carolina	Active	
Alpha Tau		Minnesota State University Moorhead	Moorhead, Minnesota	Inactive	
Alpha Upsilon		Philippine Normal University	Manila, Philippines	Inactive	
Alpha Chi		West Virginia University at Parkersburg	Parkersburg, West Virginia	Inactive	
**Alpha Psi**		Widener University	Chester, Pennsylvania	Active	
Alpha Omega	1996	Governors State University	University Park, Illinois	Inactive	
Beta Alpha		Southern Utah University	Cedar City, Utah	Inactive	
Beta Beta		Arizona State University	Tempe, Arizona	Inactive	
Beta Gamma		Purdue University Calumet	Munster, Indiana	Inactive	(Note: Merged to form Purdue University Northwest in 2016.)
**Beta Delta**		North Greenville University	Tigerville, South Carolina	Active	
**Beta Epsilon**	March 12, 2002	Holy Family University	Philadelphia, Pennsylvania	Active	
**Beta Zeta**		Weber State University	Ogden, Utah	Active	
Beta Eta		University of Illinois Urbana-Champaign	Champaign, Illinois	Inactive	
Beta Theta		Adelphi University	Garden City, New York	Inactive	
**Beta Iota**		Fordham University	New York City, New York	Active	
Beta Kappa		Central Connecticut State University	New Britain, Connecticut	Inactive	
Beta Lambda		Lock Haven University of Pennsylvania	Lock Haven, Pennsylvania	Inactive	
Beta Mu		Worcester State University	Worcester, Massachusetts	Inactive	
Beta Nu		Canisius College	Buffalo, New York	Inactive	
Beta Xi		University of South Carolina Upstate	Valley Falls, South Carolina	Inactive	
Beta Omicron		Northeastern Illinois University	Chicago, Illinois	Inactive	
**Beta Pi**		Monmouth University	West Long Branch, New Jersey	Active	
Beta Rho		Florida Memorial University	Miami Gardens, Florida	Inactive	
Beta Sigma		Queens College, City University of New York	Flushing, Queens, New York City, New York	Inactive	
Eta Rho	April 2012	Texas Woman's University	Denton, Texas	Inactive	
Sigma Beta		St. Bonaventure University	St. Bonaventure, New York	Inactive	
Alpha Delta Alpha		Hofstra University	Hempstead, New York	Inactive	
**Alpha Gamma Mu**		University of Texas at San Antonio	San Antonio, Texas	Active	
**Alpha Epsilon Chi**		Judson University	Elgin, Illinois	Active	
**Lambda Tau Alpha**		Albany State University	Albany, Georgia	Active	

== See also ==
- Honor cords
- Professional fraternities and sororities
