= Nila Banton Smith =

Nila Banton Smith (1889–1976) was a teacher, writer, administrator and specialist in reading instruction. She published a number of books and papers on this subject beginning in 1922. She was a professor at New York University. She was a proponent of the "language experience" and "whole word" approaches to reading.

== Career ==
Smith taught public school in Detroit. For her doctoral dissertation at Columbia University she wrote An Historical Analysis of American Reading Instruction; in 1934 this was published by Silver Burdett as American Reading Instruction, a book about the history of reading education in the United States.

Smith was president of the International Reading Association. She taught for many years at the Lincoln School of Columbia Teachers College. She was later director of the Reading Institute at New York University. Smith studied and wrote about various approaches to reading instruction.

Smith published a reading guide in 1957 titled Speed Reading Made Easy". It was reissued several times up until about 1987. The book includes advice on keywords, paragraph analysis, article types and skimming. This early work remains a useful guide to how to read more efficiently. She published Read Faster on the same subject.

== Legacy ==
A special edition of American Reading Instruction was reissued in 2002 which highlighted the historical research Smith undertook.

The International Reading Association offers two grants in Smith's name. One is an award to honor middle or high school teachers who have translated theory and research into practice. The second award is to support a member of the International Reading Association working on a dissemination project for the educational community.

The Nila Banton Smith Historical Collection in Reading at Hofstra University contains thousands of examples of reading instruction materials in various historical periods.

== Selected publications ==
- Nila Banton Smith (January 2002). American Reading Instruction. International Reading Association. ISBN 978-0-87207-348-7.
- Nila Banton Smith; Stephen Fielding Bayne (1940). Frontiers Old and New. Silver, Burdett.
- International Reading Association; Nila Banton Smith (1971). Reading Methods and Teacher Improvement. International Reading Association.
- N. Smith, Speed Reading Made Easy, Warner Books Printing, 1987.
- Nila Banton Smith (1964). Best of children's literature. Bobbs-Merrill.
- Nila Banton Smith; H. Alan Robinson (1 January 1980). Reading Instruction for Today's Children. Prentice-Hall. ISBN 978-0-13-755157-6.
