= Olive S. Niles =

American literacy specialist

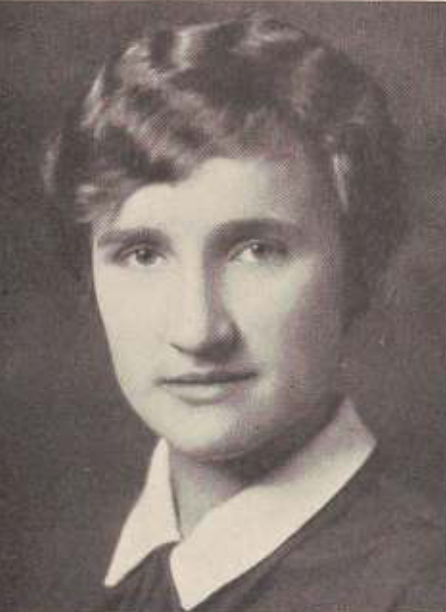
- Olive S. Niles, from the 1930 yearbook of Mount Holyoke College
- Born: Olive Stafford Niles; July 12, 1909; Bennington, Vermont, U.S.
- Died: November 10, 1990 (aged 81); Bennington, Vermont, U.S.
- Other names: Olive Sylvester
- Occupations: Educator, literacy specialist

Olive Stafford Niles (July 12, 1909 – November 10, 1990) was an American educator who specialized in literacy. She was president of the International Reading Association in 1980 and 1981.

== Early life and education ==
Niles was born in Bennington, Vermont, the daughter of J. Walter Niles and Laura Park Stafford Niles. Her mother was a former teacher. She graduated from Mount Holyoke College in 1930, and earned a master's degree in English literature at Bryn Mawr College in 1933. She began doctoral studies at the University of London, but left when a teaching position became available in Vermont. She completed her Ph.D. at Boston University in 1954, with a dissertation titled The construction and validation of a test of certain word analysis abilities for junior-senior high school pupils.

== Career ==
Niles taught school in Vermont and Massachusetts, then began teaching college courses in Connecticut, on reading education. She founded and directed the Boston University remedial reading clinic during her doctoral work there. She returned to schoolteaching after completing that degree, and was reading coordinator for the Springfield Public Schools. In the late 1960s, she worked for the Connecticut State Department of Education. She was a professor at the University of Massachusetts–Lowell late in her career; she also taught courses at American International College.

Niles edited and co-wrote textbooks in the 1970s and 1980s, for the publisher Scott Foresman. In 1977 she traveled to Abidjan to consult on a literacy project there. She was elected vice-president of the International Reading Association in 1978, and she served as president of the association from 1980 to 1981. In 1979 she was named vice-president-elect of the World Association of Reading Teachers. She was inducted into the Reading Hall of Fame in 1982.

== Publications ==
Niles' academic writing was published in scholarly journals including The English Journal, The Journal of Educational Research, Journal of Education, The High School Journal, The Reading Teacher, and Journal of the Reading Specialist. Niles also wrote, co-wrote, and edited several textbooks for high school reading classes in the 1970s and 1980s.

- "Oral English in Vocational Guidance" (1940, with Harold D. Sylvester)
- "Corrective Reading at Six Cents per Pupil" (1943, with Harold D. Sylvester)
- "Adjusting to Individual Differences in English" (1955, with Margaret J. Early)
- "Improving General Vocabulary" (1955)
- Tactics in Reading I (1961, textbook)
- "Comprehension Skills" (1963)
- "The Need for Reading Teachers" (1965)
- "Evaluation of Three Methods of Teaching First Grade Reading to Children Likely to Have Difficulty with Reading" (1965)
- "Helping High School Students to Read Better" (1965, with Will J. Massey and Virginia D. Moore)
- "Systemwide In-Service Programs in Reading" (1966)
- "Methods of Teaching Reading to First Grade Children Likely to Have Difficulty with Reading" (1967)
- "Reading skills in the English classroom" (1967)
- "The Preparation of Language Arts Teachers" (1967)
- "Reading Skills Common to the Content Areas" (1969)
- Reading: Process and Program (1970, with Kenneth S. Goodman)
- "System for Objectives-Based Assessment: Reading (SOBAR)" (1973)

== Personal life ==
Niles married fellow educator Harold D. Sylvester in the 1970s; he died in 1979. She died in 1990, at the age of 81, in Bennington, Vermont.
