= Bill Teale =

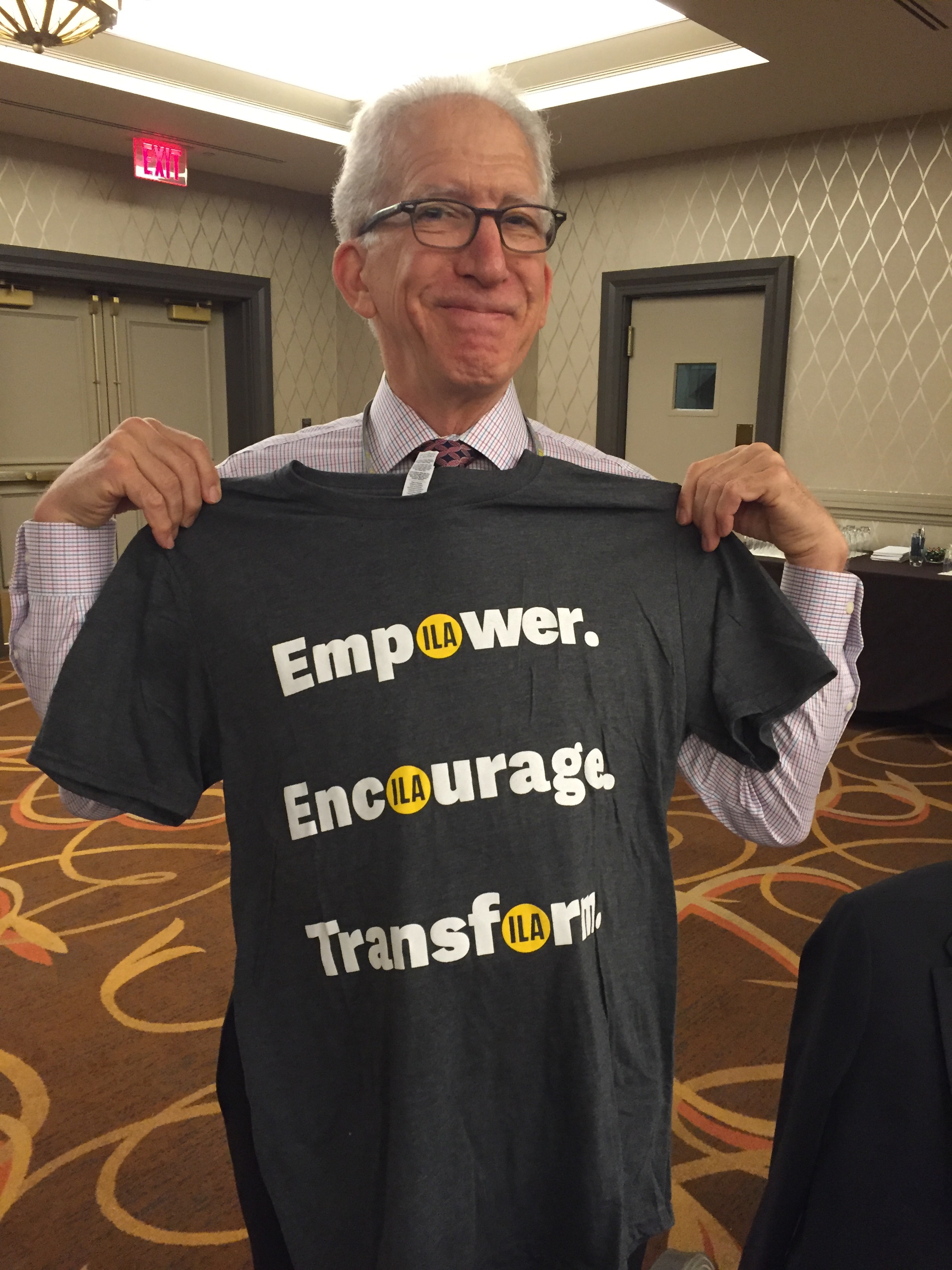
- Occupations: Professor in the Literacy, Language & Culture Program, University Scholar, Director of the University of Illinois at Chicago Center for Literacy
- Spouse: Junko Yokota
- Awards: President, International Literacy Association, 2016–2017; University Scholar, University of Illinois, 2013; Fulbright Specialist Roster, 2013; Reading Hall of Fame, International Reading Association, 2003

Academic background
- Education: University of Virginia

Academic work
- Main interests: Emergent Literacy, Children's Literature, Literacy Leadership
- Notable works: Emergent Literacy: Writing and Reading
- Website: https://uic.academia.edu/WilliamTeale

William Herbert Teale (Bill Teale) (19 June 1947 – 3 February 2018) was an American expert in early childhood literacy. He was Professor in the Literacy, Language & Culture Program, University Scholar, and director of the University of Illinois at Chicago Center for Literacy.

== Life and career ==
Born in Bentleyville, Pennsylvania on 19 June 1947, Teale received his BA in English at Pennsylvania State University, and his Ed.D in reading and English education at the University of Virginia. He served as a consultant to school districts and libraries across the United States, as well as to Children’s Television Workshop, Head Start, public television, Reach Out and Read, and NGOs in developing programs focused on literacy learning and teaching. He was also an advisor to the National Academy of Education, the U.S. Department of Education, and the National Endowment for the Humanities. He was president of the International Literary Association, 2016–2017. He was director of the UIC Center for Literacy, on the board of directors of the Literacy Research Association (2007–2009), on the board of directors of the International Reading Association (2011–2014), and president of the International Literacy Association (2016–2017). He was a former editor of Language Arts journal. He died on 3 February 2018. He was married to Junko Yokota.

In his memory, USBBY and the ILA jointly created the William H. Teale Lecture, with the aim of inviting a foreign speaker to the biennial IBBY Regional meetings (USA). The inaugural Teale lecture was given by translator Helen Wang at the conference held in Boston in November 2025.

== Selected publications ==
Teale authored over 150 publications, including:

- Teale, W. H., Whittingham, C. E., & Hoffman, E. B. (in press). Early literacy research, 2006–2015: A decade of measured progress. Journal of Early Childhood Literacy.
- Teale, W. H., Hoffman, E. B., Whittingham, C. E., & Paciga, K. (in press). Starting them young: How the shift from reading readiness to emergent literacy has influenced preschool literacy education. In C. M. Cassano & S. M. Dougherty (Eds.), Pivotal research in early literacy. New York: Guilford.
- Turner, J. (2018). Nurturing young children's literacy development through effective preschool practices and policies: A conversation with Dr. William H. Teale. Language Arts, 95(3), 176-181.
- Whittingham, C. E., Hoffman, E. B., & Teale. (2017). Recent research that should inform principals’ literacy leadership. Principal, 97(2), 20-23.
- Yokota, J., & Teale, W. H. (2017). Striving for international understanding through literature. The Reading Teacher, 70(5), 629-633.
- Hoffman, J., Teale, W. H., & Yokota, J. (2016). The book matters! Choosing complex narrative texts to support literary discussion. In H. Bohart, H. B. Collick, & K. Charner (Eds.), Teaching and learning in the primary grades (pp. 32–40). Washington, DC: National Association for the Education of Young Children.
- Teale, W. H. (2016, Sept/Oct). The power of literacy, Literacy Today.
- McKay, R. & Teale, W. H. (2015). Not this but that: No more teaching a letter a week. Portsmouth, NH: Heinemann Publishing Company.
- Hoffman, J., Teale, W. H., & Yokota, J. (2015). The book matters! Choosing narrative children’s literature to support read aloud discussion of complex texts in the early grades. Young Children, 70(4), 8-15.
- Paciga, K., Lisy, J., Teale, W. H. & Hoffman, J. (2015). Student engagement in classroom read alouds: Considering seating and timing. Illinois Reading Council Journal, 43(3), 7-14.
- Phillips, N., Woodard, R., & Teale, W. H. (2015). Impacting literacy policy—And practice. Illinois Reading Council Journal. 43(3), 3-5.
- Hoffman, J., Teale, W. H., & Paciga, K. (2014). The complexities of assessing vocabulary learning in early childhood. The Journal of Early Childhood Literacy 14(4), 459-481.
- Yokota, J., & Teale, W. H. (2014). Picture books and the digital world: Making informed choices. The Reading Teacher, 34(6) 577-585.
- Teale, W. H., Hoffman, J., & Paciga, K. (2014). What do children need to succeed in early literacy—And beyond? In K. Goodman, R. Calfee, & Y. Goodman (Eds.), Whose knowledge counts in government literacy policies? Why expertise matters (pp. 179–186). New York: Routledge.
- Chaudhri, A., & Teale, W. H. (2013). Stories of multiracial experiences in literature for children, ages 9–14. Children’s Literature in Education, 44(4), 359-376.
- Paciga, K., Lisy, J., & Teale, W. H. (2013). Better start before kindergarten: Computer technology, interactive media and the education of preschoolers. Asia-Pacific Journal of Research in Early Childhood Education, 7(2), 85-104.
- Paciga, K. A., Hoffman, J. L., & Teale, W. H. (2011). The National Early Literacy Panel Report and classroom instruction: Green lights, caution lights, and red lights. Young Children, 66(6), 50-57.
- Yokota, J., & Teale, W. H. (2011). Materials in the school reading curriculum. In T. Rasinski (Ed.), Rebuilding the foundation: Effective reading instruction for 21st century literacy (pp. 67–87). Bloomington, IN: Solution Tree Press.

== Honours and awards ==
- University Scholar at the University of Illinois (2013)
- Member of the Reading Hall of Fame (from 2003)
