= Dina Feitelson =

Israeli educator (1926–1992)

Dina Feitelson-Schur דינה פייטלסון-שור
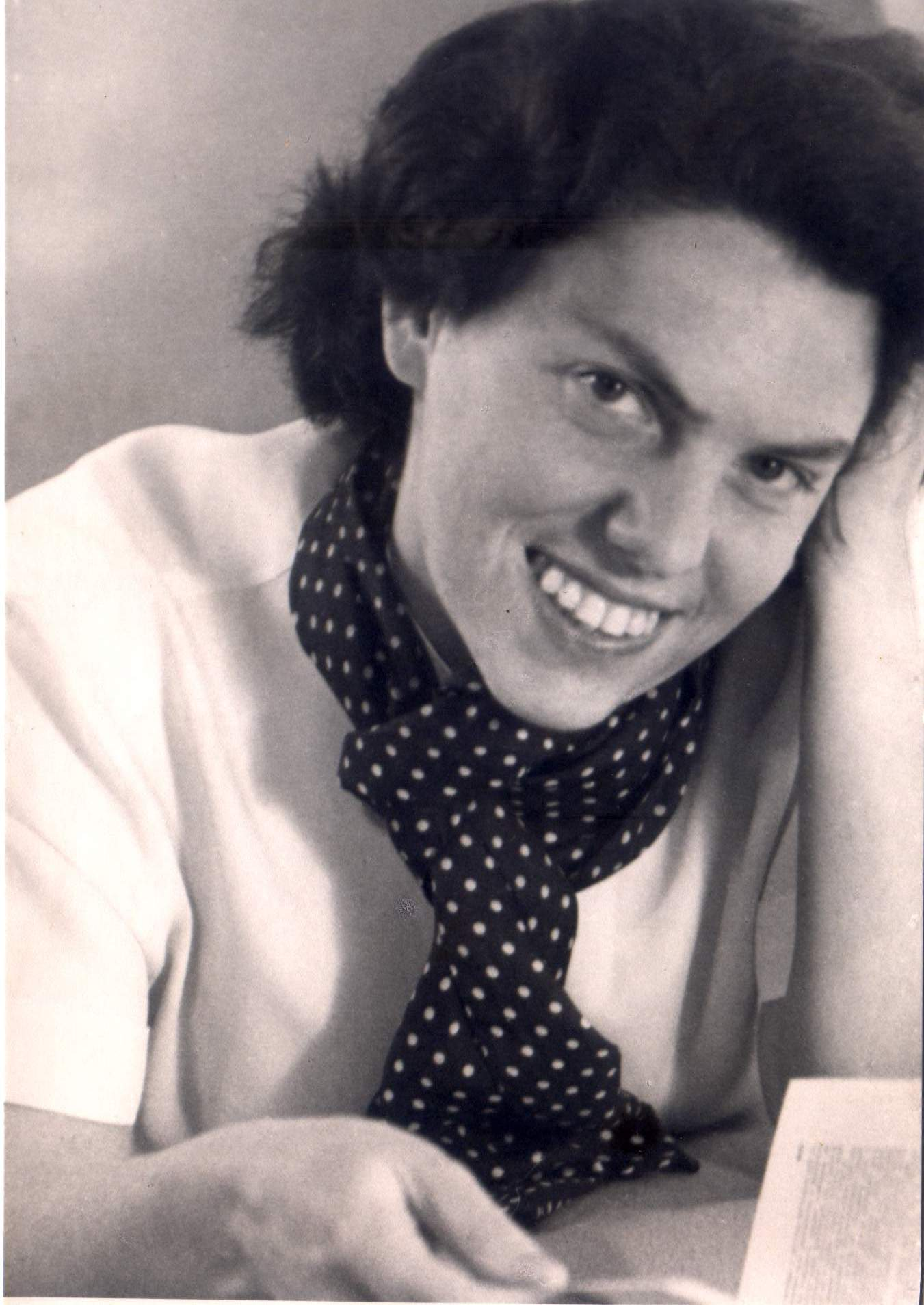
- Born: 1926; Vienna, Austria
- Died: 1992 (aged 65–66); Israel
- Citizenship: Israeli
- Occupation: educator
- Writing career
- Notable awards: Israel Prize (1953)

Dina Feitelson (Hebrew: דינה פייטלסון), also known as Dina Feitelson-Schur (Hebrew: דינה פייטלסון-שור) (born 1926; died 1992), was an Israeli educator and scholar in the field of reading acquisition.

== Biography ==
Dina Feitelson was born Dina Schur in 1926 in Vienna, and emigrated to Mandate Palestine in 1934. She studied in the Herzliya Hebrew Gymnasium in the 32nd class, which graduated in 1944. She then studied at the David Yellin College of Education in Jerusalem, and obtained a teaching certificate. After graduating she started working as an elementary school teacher.

In parallel she studied philosophy in the Hebrew University of Jerusalem. Her studies were interrupted by the 1948 Arab–Israeli War. During the war she suffered a severe head injury. She received an MA in 1951 and a PhD in 1956. Her advisor was prof. Karl Frankenstein.

Later she also worked as an inspector for the Ministry of Education. In parallel she also embarked upon an academic career, initially in the Hebrew University of Jerusalem. Then, in 1973, she accepted a post at the University of Haifa, where she became a professor of Education. She continued to work there till her death in 1992.

== Research Contributions and Impact ==
Feitelson was a pioneer of education research in Israel. She was the first to study empirically the causes of failure to achieve literacy by first grade students. This study, carried out under the auspices of the Henrietta Szold Institute, identified the problem as a mis-match between the teaching methods used and the cultural background of immigrant children. Its recommendation was to adjust the teaching materials so that they will be suitable for the children.

Later she was the first to study child rearing practices in the immigrant Kurdish community. This augmented the previous study by showing the discrepancy between the children's home environment and the expectations of the educational system.

As part of her work for the Ministry of Education, Feitelson was involved in establishing the first early-childhood divisions in schools in the 1970s, and authored the report on the pilot divisions. The early-childhood divisions combine kindergarten with the 1st and 2nd grades, to ease the transition into the school system. Such divisions are now widely adopted in many schools throughout the country. In the 1980s she initiated classroom libraries, which have been shown to increase the number of books read by beginning readers fourfold.

Feitelson was a staunch supporter of the Phonics method for teaching reading, which is especially suitable in phonetic languages like Hebrew. Following her study on the failure of first-grade students, she developed phonetic teaching materials. An important factor in her approach was that the sequence in which letters are taught should be selected carefully, to enable writing meaningful short texts with only few letters. In this way students are not required to drill reading meaningless syllables.

== Awards and recognition ==
In 1953, Feitelson was awarded the Israel Prize, in its inaugural year, in the field of education for her work on causes of failure in first grade children. She was the first woman to receive this prize, and also the youngest recipient ever (she was aged 27).

Shortly before her death, Feitelson was inducted to the International Reading Association's Reading Hall of Fame.

In 1997, the International Reading Association established the Dina Feitelson Research Award, to honour the memory of Dina Feitelson by recognizing an outstanding empirical study published in English in a referred journal. The work should report on one or more aspects of literacy acquisition, such as phonemic awareness, the alphabetic principle, bilingualism, or cross-cultural studies of beginning reading.

== Published works ==
- Feitelson, Dina (1988). Facts and Fads in Beginning Reading: A Cross-Language Perspective. Norwood, New Jersey, United States: Ablex. ISBN 0-89391-507-6.

== See also ==
- List of Israel Prize recipients
- List of Austrian Jews
