= Richard C. Anderson =

American educational psychologist

Richard C. Anderson (born 1934) is an American educational psychologist who has published influential research on children's reading, vocabulary growth, and story discussions that promote thinking. He is the director of the Center for the Study of Reading and professor emeritus at the University of Illinois at Urbana-Champaign. Anderson is a past president of the American Educational Research Association.

Anderson is also professor at Beijing Normal University and National Taiwan Normal University and president of China Children’s Books.

== Biography ==
Anderson was born in River Falls, Wisconsin. A former teacher and school administrator, Anderson was educated at Harvard University, earning his AB in American history in 1956, AMT in social-science education in 1957, and EdD in educational psychology in 1960. He has served as president of the American Educational Research Association and has been elected to the National Academy of Education. With colleagues Anderson has published 200 books and articles, notably Becoming a Nation of Readers (with Elfrieda "Freddy" Hiebert, Judith A. Scott, Ian A. G. Wilkinson), one of the most widely read books of all time in the field of literacy. Anderson's current research interests include approaches to classroom discussion that promote children’s social and intellectual development; comparative analysis of learning to read Chinese and English; and reading and public policy.

== Honors ==
Fellow, American Psychological Association, 1966;
Fulbright Hayes Fellowship, University of Leeds, Leeds, England, 1971 1972;
Palmer O. Johnson Award, in 1974 and again in 1979, from the American Educational Research Association for outstanding research paper;
Fellow, Center for Advanced Study in the Behavioral Sciences, Stanford, 1979 1980;
Elected to National Academy of Education, 1979;
Distinguished Research Award, International Reading Association, 1982;
President, American Educational Research Association, 1983;
Chairman, National Academy of Education—National Institute of Education Commission on Reading, 1984–85;
Fellowship, Japan Society for the Promotion of Science, University of Tokyo, 1987;
Oscar O. Causey Award, given annually by the National Reading Conference for outstanding contributions to reading research, 1987;
University Scholar at the University of Illinois, 1988;
Honored by Benchmark School at its 20th anniversary for exceptional contributions to the school, 1990;
Elected to the Reading Hall of Fame, 1991;
William S. Gray Citation of Merit, the highest honor of the International Reading Association, 1992;
Distinguished Contributions to Educational Research Award, American Educational Research Association, 1994;
Outstanding Service to the Field of Education Award, given annually by Lehigh University, 1994;
First Guy Bond Visiting Professor, University of Minnesota, 1996;
Edward L. Thorndike Award, given annually by the American Psychological Association for distinguished career-long contributions to the psychological study of education, 1997;
Canterbury Fellowship, University of Canterbury, 1999;
Sylvia Scribner Award, from the American Educational Research Association, which honors current research that represents a significant advance in understanding of learning and instruction, 2006;
Gallery of Scientists, Federation of Associations of Brain and Behavioral Sciences, recognizing eminent senior scientists who have made lasting and important contributions to the sciences of mind, brain, and behavior, 2011;
Richard C. Anderson Legacy Lecture and Celebration, University of Illinois, 2012;
Inaugural Lifetime Achievement Award, University of Illinois, 2012;
Boyd Lubker Visiting Scholar, Western Kentucky University, 2013;

Educational offices
| Preceded by William Cooley | President of the American Educational Research Association; 1983-1984 | Succeeded by Lee Shulman |
