= Order of Development =

- Order of Development(obverse)
- Type: 3 grades order
- Awarded for: exceptional contributions to the development of Lao PDR
- Presented by: Laos
- Eligibility: Laos and foreign
- Status: Active
- Established: 22 June 1995
- Ribbon of the Order of Development

Precedence
- Next (higher): Order of Friendship
- Related: Order of Civic Merit of Laos

The Order of Development is a high honor for the merit in the development of the Lao People's Democratic Republic. The order is awarded by the President of Laos. The order was established in 1995. There are three classes to be awarded merit class. The award is reserved for those who have made exceptional contributions to the development of the Lao People's Democratic Republic. This medal and its insignia were presented in Prime Minister's speech No. 57/Nor. Yor., on June 22.

== Design ==
It is a pointed round chest emblem, gilt with enamel, 30mm wide (as shown), with hanging ribbon.

- The obverse: sharply pointed star with seven smaller points between each arm, with central disc with development scenes and below it a half cogwheel with the name of the medal in Laotian inscription Lao text (lian-sai pad-ta-nah).
- The reverse side is plain. The ribbon: in a pentagonal suspension, a blue ribbon 25 mm with red edges 7 mm, without class change. The service bar goes by class (see below).

It was decided to change the arrangement of the ribbon bar with this medal from the previous standard - so the 1st class has one stripe, the 2nd class has two stripes, the 3rd class has three strips, unlike the original design and other Laotian PDR medals.

== Grades ==
First class
The design is a gold medal and a gold star. The ribbon is a service rod (25 mm), blue with one red stripe.
Second class
The design is a gold medal and silver star. The ribbon is a service rod (25 mm), blue with one red stripe.
Third class
The design is a silver medal and gold star. The ribbon is a service rod (25 mm), blue with one red stripe.

== Recipients ==
Year appointed	Class	Name
2019	Order First Class	Dr. Rikhi Thakral
2020	Order Second Class	Dr. Pia Rebello Britto
