= Morley (singer) =

American singer-songwriter

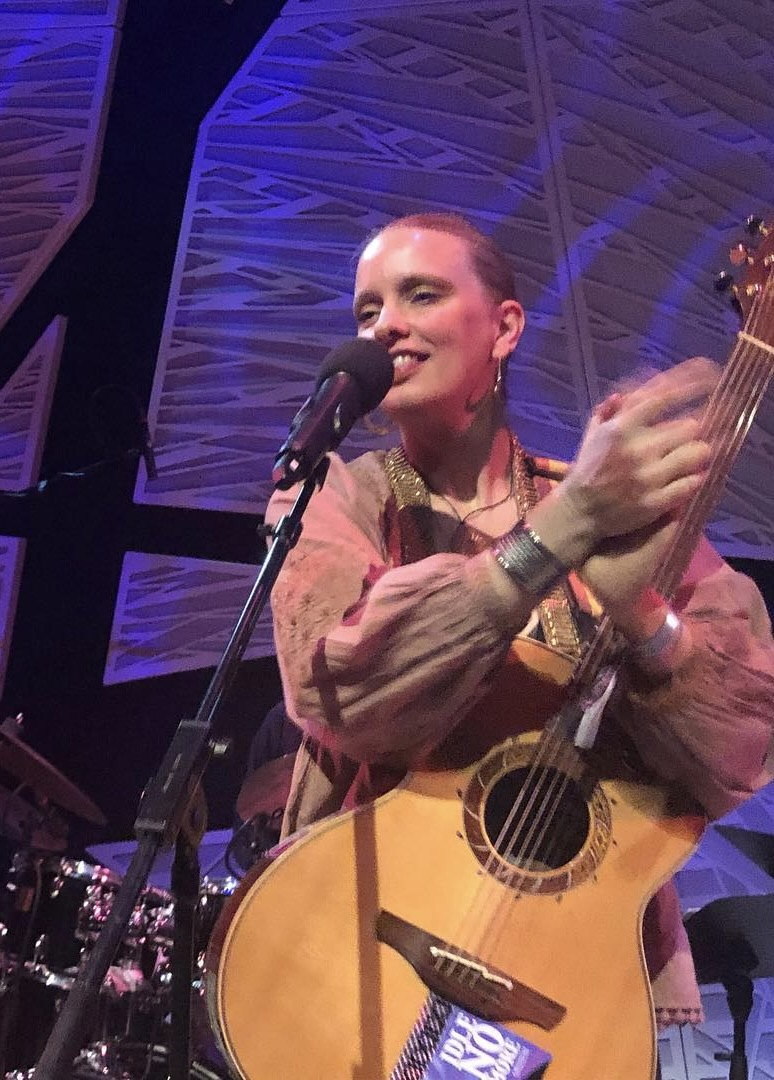

Background information
- Also known as: Morley
- Born: Morley Kamen; New York, NY, U.S.
- Genres: Folk; americana; jazz; adult alternative; world; soul; pop
- Occupations: Singer-Songwriter; Record Producer; Musician
- Instruments: Vocalist, Guitar, Percussion
- Years active: 1998-1999, 2005-present
- Labels: Sony; Universal; Wrasse; Independent
- Spouse: Chris Bruce
- Website: morleymusic.org

Morley Kamen, known professionally as Morley, is an American singer-songwriter, recording artist, music producer, and curator. Her music incorporates a wide variety of world influences, including folk, jazz, soul, and pop. Morley uses music as a tool for dialogue facilitation and trauma release when working with survivors of human trafficking and war.

== Early life and education ==
Morley was born and raised in New York City, where she attended the United Nations International School in Parkway Village, Jamaica Queens, and later attended the Duke Ellington High School for the Performing Arts in Washington, D.C. During her time in D.C. After high school, Morley received a full scholarship to the Alvin Ailey American Dance Center in New York where she danced and choreographed before becoming a musician. While there, she also taught yoga in rehabilitation, detention, and cultural centers around the New York tri-state area.

== Career ==
Morley began her performing career in spoken word and choreography. Her piece, Mother Nature, was part of the repertoire for Alvin Ailey’s Techniques and Performance touring ensemble. Drummer Max Roach invited Morley to choreograph the 30th anniversary celebration of his album, We Insist!, which featured percussion and human rights icon Babatunde Olatunji. In 1997, Morley began writing lyrics for songs with friends Hod David, Joan Wasser, Amp Fiddler, Jeff Buckley, and Chris Dowd. And in September 1998, Morley released her first album, Sun Machine, on Sony/Work.

When Sony/Work folded the following year, Morley returned to teaching and choreography until she self-released her second album, Days Like These, in 2005, which she then licensed to Universal Records/Polydor France in 2006. Morley was also the singing and speaking voice for Ralph Lauren’s My Romance fragrance from 2007‒2011.

Over the years, Morley's music has appeared in human rights documentaries, as well as on network television shows, including Days of Our Lives, General Hospital, Dawson’s Creek, and Felicity. As a lyricist, Morley has contributed to albums for artists such as Lizz Wright, Youn Sun Nah, Richard Bona, and Yuri Buenaventura.

Morley's performance of her original song “Sea of Oms” from Yoga Release (Rhythms & Improv) has hit over 8 million streams on Spotify in the genre of ambient and meditation music.

Allmusic writer Tom Demalon called Sun Machine an "impressive [debut] that infuses her melodic brand of adult pop with folk, world, and jazz." Martin Johnson of Newsday wrote that the album's songs "recalled the socially conscious soul of the early '70s."^{[4]} Spin's Tracey Pepper suggested that the album shared qualities of those by, Annie Lennox and Tracey Thorn while Time compared Morley to Joni Mitchell Sade and Portishead. Morley released her second album Days Like These, in 2005 and licensed it in 2006, to Universal/Polydor France, followed by an Artist deal for third album Seen produced by Jean-Philippe Allard and Jay Newland in 2008 for Universal/Polydor France. Thom Jurek of Allmusic praised Seen as "an album so original and poetically beautiful, it deserves its own category. “Temporary Lighthouses” recalls the very best from Joni Mitchell's jazz period, without being anything other than another reflection of Morley’s singing voice and writing chops. “There There" is so soulful that this woman could duet with Terry Callier.”

In 2008 Morley joined on as one of the original cast members of Toshi Reagon and Bernice Johnson Reagon’s Parable of the Sower the Opera, an adaptation of Octavia E. Butler’s book, Parable of the Sower.

Morley's fourth album Undivided, was released in April 2012. Recorded with such guests as Joan Wasser, Raul Midón, and David Amram. The music video for the single "Wild Bird", directed by Damani Baker (Still Bill) was filmed in the Sahara Desert.

In August 2012 Morley published her fifth album, Yoga Release (Rhythms & Improv) an exploration of rhythm and spiritual survival. Featuring the bassist, William Parker, and drummer, Hamid Drake. September 2018 Morley released her sixth album, Thousand Miles featuring Brian Blade, Jon Cowherd, Toshi Reagon Randy Radic of Pop Dust Magazine;“Morley's stunning voice mingles the best tonal textures of Joni Mitchell and Sade smooth and sensuous. Thousand Miles is one of those rare albums worthy of being classified as “must-listen-to."

July 4, 2019 Morley spearheaded and released Borderless Lullabies a various artist benefit compilation featuring: Yo-Yo Ma, Jacqueline Woodson, Maria Popova, Lizz Wright, Toshi Reagon, Meryl Streep and more.

August 4, 2023, Morley released her first Children/Family album, a various artist compilation: Story of the Sky with her husband, Chris Bruce, under the Artist name, The Bruces. Claudia Taylor of World Music Central says "Each track on Story of the Sky serves as a musical compass, guiding listeners toward a deeper understanding of our place in the universe and the beauty of interconnection. Beginning with the a cappella introduction by Morley on the title track, the album gradually unfolds with heartfelt duets, such as the one with 92-year-old Maestro David Amram."

September 27, 2024, Morley released her latest album, Follow The Sound. Contributors include Meshell Ndegeocello (bass, percussion, vocals), Toumani Diabaté (kora), Shara Nova a.k.a. My Brightest Diamond (vocals), Jon Cowherd (piano, vocals), Chris Bruce (guitar, bass, vocals), Arun & Trina Ramamurthy (violins), Cole Kamen (trumpet), Jason Charles Walker, Alex Koi (supporAng vocals) and Jack DeBoe, Jay Bellerose, and Abe Rounds (drums, percussion).

== Discography ==
- Sun Machine (1998)
- Days Like These (2005)
- Seen (2008)
- Undivided (2012)
- Yoga Release (Rhythms & Improv) (2012)
- Thousand Miles (2018)
- Borderless Lullabies (2019)
- Story Of The Sky (2023)
- Follow The Sound (2024)

== Accolades ==
- Abe Olman Songwriter Hall of Fame
- ASCAP songwriter of the year
- New York Times Emerging Artist
- Cafe Royal Cultural Foundation Grant Awardee
- Baldwin Center for the Arts residency
- Looking Glass Arts residency
- Wavelengths Key Note
- TED Women, TED Salon and TED x presenter
- Women Nomad Festival distinguished collaborator award
