= Richard Allington =

American scholar and researcher

Richard (Dick) L. Allington is an American scholar who was a professor of education at the University of Tennessee at Knoxville from 2005 until his retirement in 2017.

Allington served as the president of the International Reading Association (IRA), as president of the National Reading Conference, and as a member of the International Reading Association board of directors.

== Biography ==
Allington grew up on a dairy farm in rural Michigan and attended a one-room schoolhouse through 6th grade. He graduated from Cedar Springs High School in 1965 and went on to Western Michigan University to become a teacher. After graduating from Western Michigan University in 1968 with his Elementary Education and Social Science degree, he became a 4th and 5th-grade classroom teacher. Experiencing difficulty in dealing with students needing remedial reading instruction, he completed his Master of Arts in Reading degree in 1969, and moved on to become to the Title I director for Belding Area Schools in Michigan. Although he had plans to eventually become a superintendent, his experiences during his doctoral study refocused his attention on academia and research. In 1973 he earned his Ph.D. in elementary and special education from Michigan State University and has since achieved a scholarly career in the fields of literacy and education.

- 1969–1973, Ph.D., Michigan State University, elementary and special education
- 1968–1969, M.A., Western Michigan University, reading education
- 1965–1968, B.A., Western Michigan University, social science/elementary education

== Career ==
- 2017–present, professor emeritus, University of Tennessee at Knoxville
- 2005-2017, professor of education, University of Tennessee at Knoxville
- 2000–2004, Fien Distinguished Professor of Education, University of Florida
- 1995–1999, Chair, department of reading, and senior research scientist at National Research Center for English Learning and Achievement University at Albany, SUNY
- 1989–1999, Professor, teaching and research, University at Albany, SUNY
- 1987–1989, Director, Center for Teaching Effectiveness, State University of New York at Albany,
- 1982–1988, Chair, department of reading, State University of New York at Albany
- 1981, Visiting professor/teaching, Eastern Montana College
- 1978–1981, Associate professor/teaching and research, State University of New York at Albany
- 1976, Visiting professor/teaching, University of Minnesota
- 1973–1978, Assistant professor/teaching and research, State University of New York at Albany
- 1971–1973, Graduate assistant and lecturer, Michigan State
- 1969–1971, Title I director/reading teacher, Belding Area Schools, MI
- 1968–1969, Classroom teacher, Grade 4/5, Kent City Schools, MI

== Publications ==
- Allington, Richard L. & Patricia Cunningham, Schools that Work: Where All Children Learn to Read, Pearson, 2006.
- Allington, Richard, L. Response to Intervention: Research-Based Designs, Pearson, 2008
- McGill-Franzen, Anne M. & Allington, Richard L. Handbook of Reading Disabilities Research, Routledge, 2010
- Allington, Richard, L. What Really Matters for Struggling Readers: Designing Research-Based Programs, Pearson, 2012
- Allington, Richard L. & McGill-Franzen, Anne M. Summer Reading: Closing the Rich/Poor Reading Achievement Gap, Teachers College Press, 2013
- Pressley, Michael & Richard L. Allington, "Reading Instruction that Works: The Case for Balanced Teaching", Guilford Press, 2014.
- Cunningham, Patricia & Allington, Richard L., Classrooms that Work: Where All Children Read and Write, Pearson, 2015.
