= Pia Rebello Britto =

American political scientist

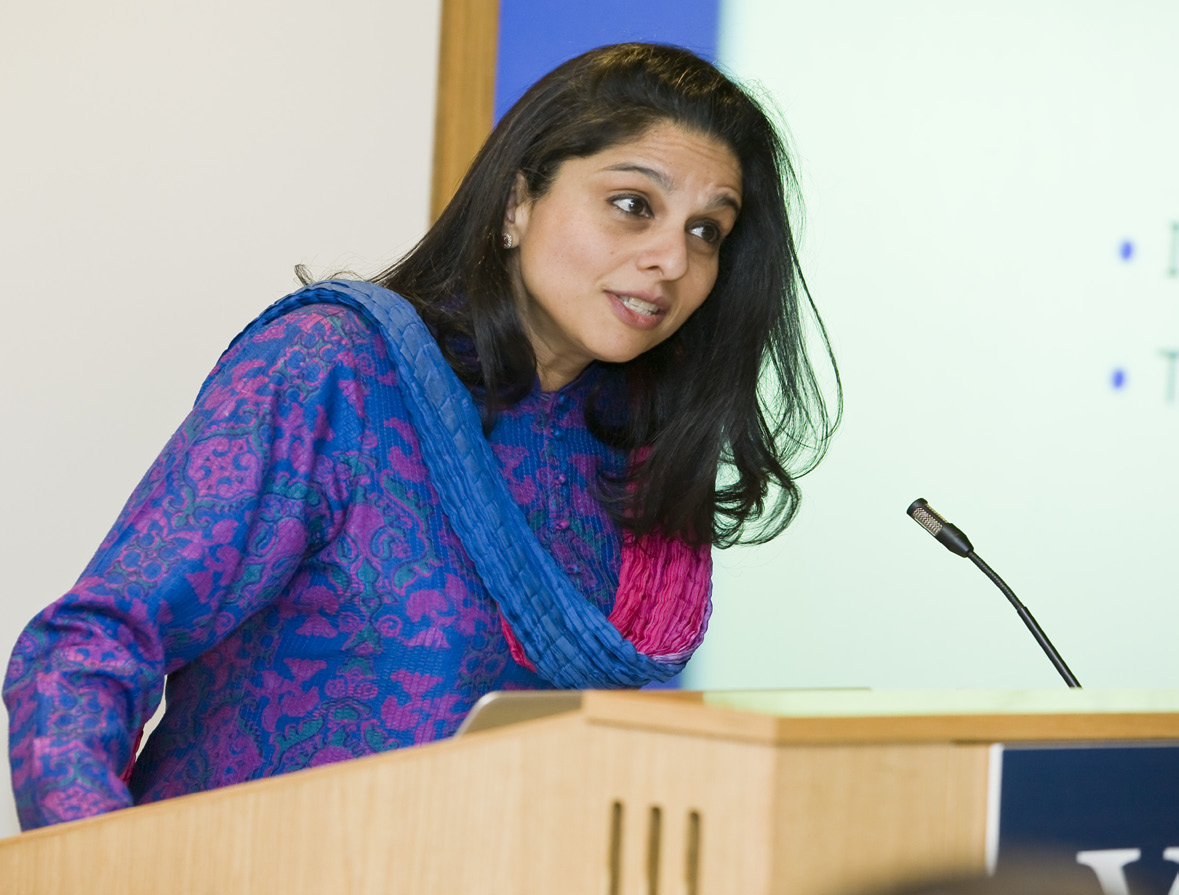
- Photo of Pia Rebello Britto speaking at an event, Yale 2014.

Pia Rebello Britto (born 7 May 1966) is an Indian academic and development professional. In August 2024, she became the global director of education of UNICEF.

Britto joined UNICEF in 2013. She was responsible for bringing neuroscience to inform global policies, and spearheaded the push to add early childhood development as another sustainable development goal. Britto has worked toward creating a global movement for early childhood development.

In 2020, Britto receive the Order of Development Second Class from Laos.

== Publications ==
- Britto, P.R.; Engle, P.L; Super, C.M. Handbook of Early Childhood Development Research and Its Impact on Global Policy. New York: Oxford University Press. New York, 2013, ISBN 9780199922994
- Britto, P.R.; Kagan, S.L. (2010). "Global status of early learning and development standards". In Penelope Peterson; Eva Baker; Barry McGaw. International Encyclopedia of Education. Volume 2. . Oxford: Elsevier. pp. 138–143.
