= Look (surname) =

Family name

Look is a surname. Notable people with the surname include:

- Bruce Look (born 1943), American baseball player
- Dean Look (born 1937), American football and baseball player
- Kairi Look (born 1983), Estonian children's author
- Simon Look (born 1958), Israeli footballer

== See also ==
- Gerrit van Look (born 1985), German rugby union player
