= Darrell Morris =

American football coach (born c. 1961)

Biographical details
- Born: c. 1961 (age 64–65); Tampa, Florida, U.S.
- Education: Northwest Missouri State University (1983)

Playing career
- 1979–1982: Northwest Missouri State
- Position: Quarterback

Coaching career (HC unless noted)
- 1983–1985: Southwestern (KS) (RB)
- 1986–1998: Kearney State / Nebraska–Kearney (OL)
- 1999: Nebraska–Kearney (AHC/OL)
- 2000–2014: Nebraska–Kearney

Head coaching record
- Overall: 101–63
- Tournaments: 1–4 (NCAA D-II playoffs)

Accomplishments and honors

Championships
- 4 RMAC (2002, 2005, 2009–2010)

Darrell Morris (born c. 1961) is an American former college football coach. He was the head football coach for the University of Nebraska at Kearney from 2000 to 2014. He also coached for Southwestern (KS). He played college football for Northwest Missouri State as a quarterback.

== Head coaching record ==
Year	Team	Overall	Conference	Standing	Bowl/playoffs	AFCA^{#}
Nebraska–Kearney Lopers (Rocky Mountain Athletic Conference) (2000–2011)
2000	Nebraska–Kearney	7–3	6–2	3rd		6 (West)
2001	Nebraska–Kearney	8–2	7–1	2nd		
2002	Nebraska–Kearney	9–2	7–1	T–1st	L NCAA Division II First Round	12
2003	Nebraska–Kearney	5–5	4–4	T–4th		
2004	Nebraska–Kearney	5–6	4–4	5th		
2005	Nebraska–Kearney	9–3	7–1	1st	L NCAA Division II First Round	24
2006	Nebraska–Kearney	6–4	5–3	3rd		
2007	Nebraska–Kearney	6–4	5–3	4th		
2008	Nebraska–Kearney	7–4	7–2	T–2nd		
2009	Nebraska–Kearney	11–2	9–0	1st	L NCAA Division II Second Round	8
2010	Nebraska–Kearney	9–2	8–1	T–1st		23
2011	Nebraska–Kearney	10–2	8–1	2nd	L NCAA Division II Second Round	10
Nebraska–Kearney Lopers (Mid-America Intercollegiate Athletics Association) (2012–2014)
2012	Nebraska–Kearney	3–8	2–8	T–13th		
2013	Nebraska–Kearney	3–8	3–6	9th		
2014	Nebraska–Kearney	3–8	3–8	10th		
Nebraska–Kearney:		101–63	85–45			
Total:		101–63				
National championship Conference title Conference division title or championship game berth
