= The Looking =

- Origin: New York City, New York, U.S.
- Genres: Americana, Indie Pop
- Years active: 2005– present

The Looking is the current musical project of American singer, songwriter and producer Todd Carter. Carter has described the band’s music as “indie pop meets Americana” with influences ranging through “opera, punk rock, traditional folk, and psychedelic soul.”

== Recordings ==
The Looking has recorded three full length records and one EP, beginning with Tin Can Head in 2005 and Cabinet of Curiosities in 2009. Those were followed by 2013’s acclaimed Songs for a Traveler, a compendium of Carter’s takes on classic American folk songs and spirituals. The Looking’s latest album (2016’s Lead me to the Water) features Andy Hess (formerly of Gov’t Mule and Black Crowes) on bass, Diego Voglino (Marshall Crenshaw) on drums, Steve Elliott (Shooter Jennings) on guitar, Bill Finizio on piano/guitar and Sasha Dobson (Norah Jones) with background vocals. The album is released by Astraea Records.

As The Looking, Todd Carter recorded the EP Alone the other Night with New York City’s Astraea Studios.

== Discography ==
- Tin Can Head (2005)
- Cabinet of Curiosities (2009)
- Songs for a Traveler (2013)
- Alone the other Night (EP, 2015)
- Lead Me to the Water (2016)
