= Even Start Program =

The Even Start Program is a federally funded program in the United States that gives families access to training and support to create a literate home environment and enhance the academic achievement of their children. The program was first authorized in 1988, and administration was moved to individual states in 1992. The program aims to:

- Help children to reach their full potential as learners (early childhood education)
- Provide literacy training for parents (adult education)
- Help parents to become full partners in education of their children (parenting education)

In May 2009, President Barack Obama proposed eliminating the program. As of June 2010, the program is still funded.

== Early childhood education ==
The components of early childhood are for children that are at least 6 weeks to 3 years of age. The children learn different things according to their age, while parents are attending adult education classes.

== Adult education ==
Adults can complete their high school education, work towards their GED, participate in Adult Basic Education classes, and participate in English as a Second Language.

== Parenting education ==
The Even Start Parenting Education Program helps to educate and inform parents on topics that relate to being a parent. The Parenting Education Class is a requirement of the Even Start program. Parents receive credit for attending these sessions. Lunch is usually provided on the days the parenting classes are scheduled.

== Parents and Children Together (PACT) ==
The child and parent interaction takes place in the infant, younger toddler, and older toddler classrooms. It gives the child and the parent a chance to spend quality time together. Learning is what both the parents and the children do at this time to become true partners in their education. Activities are provided for the child and the parent on these daily occasions.

== Home visits ==
The Home Visitor Program is provided to support families in transferring learning from the classroom to their daily lives. The home visits provide literacy-based activities in the home. The visitor brings a book and/or an activity and discusses with the parents the importance of literacy in the home. These visits are once a month and the day and parent, child and the home visitor mutually agree upon time. This is also an Even Start requirement.
