= Family literacy =

Form of literacy education

Family literacy is a method of education.

Relatively new, family literacy is being put into practice in the United States, Canada, and South Africa.

== Philosophy ==
The roots of family literacy as an educational method come from the belief that “the parent is the child's first teacher.” Studies have demonstrated that adults who have a higher level of education tend to not only become productive citizens with enhanced social and economic capacity in society, but their children are also more likely to be successful in school. Literate parents are better able to support the learning of their children. Establishing family literacy programs is the most effective strategy to increase parental involvement and literacy development. The purpose of parental literacy curriculum is to increase students' academic achievement. When family literacy programs are established, parents become advocates for their child's literacy. Simultaneously students' literacy excels as parents become empowered. When parents are empowered they become active lifelong participants in their child's education.

== Overview ==
Comprehensive family literacy services provide a holistic, fully integrated, family-focused approach, providing parents and children most in need of improving their literacy skills with intensive, frequent, and long-term educational and non-educational services. Family literacy services make sustainable changes in a family by integrating all of the following activities:

- Adult education: designed to extend basic academic level, think critically and creatively, solve problems, set and achieve goals, and acquire successful workplace and interpersonal skills.
- Childhood education: designed to promote the growth and development of young children and to engage parents in their child's educational program in order to foster meaningful involvement that will be maintained throughout the child's educational career.
- Parent education: provides instruction on how children grow, develop, and learn. It addresses issues critical to family well-being, connects parents with community resources, and provides opportunities for parents to network and develop mutual support systems.
- Interactive parent–child activities: provides parents and children the opportunity to share their newly developed literacy experiences. Parents and children interact together, enriching their relationship through reciprocal learning that takes place, enabling them to become true partners in education.

== Examples ==
- Adult education: The goal of educating parents is to empower and provide resources to parents who are a child's first teacher. Adult education helps to rebuild relationships between parents and the school's faculty and staff. Some classes and activities provided for parents at the Prairie State College Family Literacy Project are English as a second language classes, adult basic education classes, general education development certifications, and vocational training. Childhood education: Helping to involve parents can be done in a child's learning through play groups, sharing stories and books together, and child-directed play time that all help the child to bond with their parents.
- Parent education: The family literacy program developed in Illinois at the Prairie State Family Literacy Program provides parental support about health issues, good nutrition, discipline, and takes parents and children on field trips to purchase books for children to read at home.
- Interactive parent–child activities: The Prairie State Family Literacy Program has developed a special time for interactive activities that they call "P.A.C.T." time. P.A.C.T. time involves play groups with both parents and their children working together. They are separated by age groups to help guide the interaction and activities.
- Greenman Elementary in Illinois established the first family literacy project called P.A.L. (Parents Advocating Literacy) in district 129. Since 2010 over 100 parents have become members of P.A.L. (Parents Advocating Literacy.) P.A.L. is a family literacy project that teaches parents strategies that teachers use in the classroom every day. Establishing P.A.L. is the most effective approach to increase parental involvement in reading development. The purpose of family literacy curriculum is to increase students' achievement by connecting school and home. When family literacy is established, parents become advocates for their child's literacy. Through P.A.L. parents become empowered and become lifelong supporters of their child's education. P.A.L. was implemented district-wide in 2013. The program is also in other districts throughout Illinois.
- F.R.E.D.: Fathers Reading Every Day is a family literacy program developed at Texas A&M University. In this program, fathers or father figures such as grandparents, uncles, or family friends are encouraged to read to their children every day for four weeks.

== See also ==
- Barbara Bush Foundation for Family Literacy
- Even Start
