= International Literacy Association =

International professional organization

- Formation: 1956
- Purpose: Literacy
- Headquarters: Newark, Delaware, United States
- Region served: International
- President: Danielle V. Dennis
- Website: www.literacyworldwide.org

The International Literacy Association (ILA), formerly the International Reading Association (IRA), is an international global advocacy and member professional organization established in 1956 to improve reading instruction, facilitate research on reading, and encourage reading habits across the globe.

The organization is headquartered in Newark, Delaware, United States, with a network of more than 300,000 literacy educators, researchers, and experts across 128 countries. The current President of the Board is Danielle V. Dennis.

== Publishing ==
ILA officially ended its book publishing program on June 30, 2018. However, the organization continues to publish three peer-reviewed academic journals:

- The Reading Teacher—for those working with children to age 12
- Journal of Adolescent & Adult Literacy—for teachers of older learners
- Reading Research Quarterly—publishes contributions in literacy research

Reading Online, an e-journal, sponsored by the organization, was retired in 2005.

Literacy Today (formerly titled Reading Today), ILA’s membership magazine, was published from 1983 to 2011 as a bimonthly membership newspaper. From the 2011 August/September issue forward, the publication was split into two parts: a bimonthly print magazine and an interactive digital e-zine. Literacy Today is currently an online-only quarterly magazine.

== Standards for the Preparation of Literacy Professionals, 2017 Edition ==
ILA champions rigorous research as the foundation for literacy leadership and as such developed research-based standards for preparing and certifying literacy professionals: Standards for the Preparation of Literacy Professionals, 2017 Edition (ILA Standards).

== Special interest groups ==
ILA offers special interest groups for members:

- Concern for Affect in Reading Education (CARE)
- Children's Literature and Reading
- College Literacy and Learning
- District Literacy Leadership (DiLL)
- Literacy and Social Responsibility
- Mastery Learning
- Organization of Teacher Educators in Literacy (OTEL)
- Professors of Literacy and Teacher Education (PLTE)
- Reading Disabilities
- Reading for Gifted and Creative Students

== Honor society ==
ILA sponsors the honor society Alpha Upsilon Alpha.

== Awards and grants ==
ILA offers a number of awards and grants for educators, researchers, and authors.

Grants provide the opportunity for acclaimed field members to explore research areas in reading and literacy. Awards provide recognition to renowned authors, teachers, researchers, librarians, programs, etc. Applications are considered yearly by committees of member volunteers.

- The William S. Gray Citation of Merit is reserved for those ILA members who have made outstanding contributions to multiple facets of literacy development, including but not limited to research, theory, practice, and policy. It is the highest individual honor awarded by ILA.
- The Elva Knight Research Grant program annually provides funds to deserving researchers focused on literacy or teaching literacy. Applicants can conduct research in any way, but they must be ILA members focusing on reading/literacy. The grant is for $5,000 each. Applications close mid-March.
- The ILA offers the Timothy and Cynthia Shanahan Outstanding Dissertation Award. Submitted applicants win based on their doctoral research conducted regarding literacy and/or reading. The committee considers research methodology, importance, literature review, and rationale to choose winners.
- The ILA offers the Jerry Johns Outstanding Teacher Educator in Reading Award to a higher education professor who goes beyond average teaching to provide students with progressive, scholarly education on literacy and reading, while acting as a mentor for students. The award is $1,000.
- Beginning in 1975, the ILA has offered a children’s literature award, which later became an annual award known as the Children’s and Young Adult's Book Awards. It is provided to authors' first or second published book that shows potential early on in their career. Many winners have gone on to receive other prominent award such as the Newbery Medal, Sibert Medal, Orbis Pictus Award, Coretta Scott King Award, Carnegie Medal, etc. The award includes six categories: Primary Fiction, Primary Nonfiction, Intermediate Fiction, Intermediate Nonfiction, Young Adult Fiction, and Young Adult Nonfiction. A committee of 15 professors, teachers, specialists, and people with experience in the field are chosen to pick one winner and one honor in each category every year. Authors from any country can apply for the award, but must be published in English in the calendar year.
  - Prominent winners of the award include Laurence Yep, Nancy Bond, Christopher Paul Curtis, Karen Hesse, Sy Montgomery, Patricia Polacco, Philip Pullman, Rainbow Rowell, Rebecca Stead, Vince Vawter, and Virginia Euwer Wolff.

== List of presidents ==
The following have served as presidents of the ILA:

- William S. Gray (1955–1956)
- Nancy Larrick (1956–1957)
- Albert J. Harris (1957–1958)
- George D. Spache (1958–1959)
- A. Sterl Artley (1959–1960)
- Mary C. Austin (1960–1961)
- William D. Sheldon (1961–1962)
- Morton Botel (1962–1963)
- Nila Banton Smith (1963–1964)
- Theodore Clymer (1964–1965)
- Dorothy K. Bracken (1965–1966)
- Mildred A. Dawson (1966–1967)
- H. Alan Robinson (1967–1968)
- Leo C. Fay (1968–1969)
- Helen Huus (1969–1970)
- Donald L. Cleland (1970–1971)
- Theodore L. Harris (1971–1972)
- William K. Durr (1972–1973)
- Millard H. Black (1973–1974)
- Constance McCullough (1974–1975)
- Thomas C. Barrett (1975–1976)
- Walter H. MacGinitie (1976–1977)
- William Eller (1977–1978)
- Dorothy S. Strickland (1978–1979)
- Roger C. Farr (1979–1980)
- Olive S. Niles (1980–1981)
- Kenneth S. Goodman (1981–1982)
- Jack Cassidy (1982–1983)
- Ira E. Aaron (1983–1984)
- Bernice E. Cullinan (1984–1985)
- John C. Manning (1985–1986)
- Roselmina Indrisano (1986–1987)
- Phyllis J. Adams (1987–1988)
- Patricia S. Koppman (1988–1989)
- Dale Johnson (1989–1990)
- Carl Braun (1990–1991)
- Judith Thelen (1991–1992)
- Marie M. Clay (1992–1993)
- Doris Roettger (1993–1994)
- Susan Mandel Glazer (1994–1995)
- Dolores B. Malcolm (1995–1996)
- Richard T. Vacca (1996–1997)
- John J. Pikulski (1997–1998)
- Kathryn A. Ransom (1998–1999)
- Carol M. Santa (1999–2000)
- Carmelita K. Williams (2000–2001)
- Donna M. Ogle (2001–2002)
- Jerry L. Johns (2002–2003)
- Lesley Mandel Morrow (2003–2004)
- MaryEllen Vogt (2004–2005)
- Richard Allington (2005–2006)
- Timothy Shanahan (2006–2007)
- Linda Gambrell (2007–2008)
- Barbara Walker (2008–2009)
- Kathryn H. Au (2009–2010)
- Patricia A. Edwards (2010–2011)
- Victoria J. Risko (2011–2012)
- Carrice Cummins (2012–2013)
- Maureen McLaughlin (2013–2014)
- Jill Lewis-Spector (2014–2015)
- Diane Barone (2015–2016)
- William Teale (2016–2017)
- Douglas Fisher (2017–2018)
- Bernadette Dwyer (2018–2019)
- Kathy N. Headley (2019–2020)
- Stephen G. Peters (2020–2021)
- Robert J. Tierney (2021–2022)
- Kenneth Kunz (2022–2023)
- Kia Brown-Dudley (2023–2024)
- J. Helen Perkins (2024–2025)
- Dana A. Robertson (2025–2026)

== Affiliations ==
ILA has been recognized by the United Nations Educational, Scientific and Cultural Organization (UNESCO) since 1978; ILA was reclassified to have Consultative Status with UNESCO in 1996 and continues to hold this status.
