= National Defense Education Act =

United States law enacted 1958

- Long title: An Act to strengthen the national defense and to encourage and assist in the expansion and improvement of educational programs to meet critical national needs and for other purposes.
- Nicknames: National Defense Education Act of 1958
- Enacted by: the 85th United States Congress
- Effective: September 2, 1958

Citations
- Public law: 85-864
- Statutes at Large: 72 Stat. 1580

Codification
- Titles amended: 20 U.S.C.: Education
- U.S.C. sections created: 20 U.S.C. ch. 17, subch. I §§ 401-403; 20 U.S.C. ch. 17, subch. II §§ 421-429; 20 U.S.C. ch. 17, subch. III §§ 441-445, 451-455; 20 U.S.C. ch. 17, subch. IV §§ 461-465; 20 U.S.C. ch. 17, subch. V §§ 481-485, 491; 20 U.S.C. ch. 17, subch. VI §§ 511-513, 521; 20 U.S.C. ch. 17, subch. VII §§ 541, 542, 551, 561-563; 20 U.S.C. ch. 17, subch. VIII §§ 581-589; 20 U.S.C. ch. 17, subch. IX §§ 591-592, 601-602

Legislative history
- Introduced in the House as H.R. 13247; Passed the House on August 7, 1958 (266-108, in lieu of H.Res. 675); Passed the Senate on August 13, 1958 (62-26); Reported by the joint conference committee on August 22, 1958; agreed to by the Senate on August 22, 1958 (66-15) and by the House on August 23, 1958 (212-85); Signed into law by President Dwight D. Eisenhower on September 2, 1958

The National Defense Education Act (NDEA) was signed into law on September 2, 1958, providing funding to United States education institutions at all levels.

NDEA was among many science initiatives implemented by President Dwight D. Eisenhower in 1958 to increase the technological sophistication and power of the United States alongside, for instance, DARPA and NASA. It followed a growing national sense that U.S. scientists were falling behind scientists in the Soviet Union. The early Soviet success in the Space Race catalyzed a national sense of unease with Soviet technological advances, especially after the Soviet Union launched the first-ever satellite, Sputnik, the previous year.

The act authorized funding for four years, increasing funding per year: for example, funding increased on eight program titles from $183 million in 1959 to $222 million in 1960. In total, over a billion dollars was directed towards improving American science curricula. However, in the aftermath of McCarthyism, a mandate was inserted in the act that all beneficiaries must complete an affidavit disclaiming belief in the overthrow of the U.S. government. This requisite loyalty statement stirred concern and protest from the American Association of University Professors and over 153 institutions.

== Cause and purpose ==
The NDEA was influenced by the Soviet launch of the satellite Sputnik on October 4, 1957. U.S. citizens feared that education in the USSR was superior to that in the United States, and Congress reacted by adding the act to bring U.S. schools up to speed.

While Sputnik was the major immediate cause for getting the NDEA passed, other factors also influenced its formation. One reason for its creation can be connected to the President’s Commission on Higher Education of 1947, titled Higher Education for American Democracy. This commission aimed to have more American men and women attend higher education programs and graduate from 4-year colleges and universities. In the long term, the NDEA was intended to be used in tandem with other educational programs created by the federal government.

The year 1957 also coincided with an acute shortage of mathematicians in the United States. The electronic computer created a demand for mathematicians as programmers and it also shortened the lead time between the development of a new mathematical theory and its practical application, thereby making their work more valuable. The United States could no longer rely on European refugees for all of its mathematicians, though they remained an important source, so it had to drastically increase the domestic supply. At the time, "mathematics" was interpreted as pure mathematics rather than applied mathematics. The problem in the 1950s and 1960s was that industry, including defense, was absorbing the mathematicians who were also needed at high schools and universities training the next generation. At the university level, even more recently, there have been years when it was difficult to hire applied mathematicians and computer scientists because of the rate that industry was absorbing them.

Additionally, more high school graduates were beginning to attend college. In 1940 about one-half million Americans attended college, which was about 15 percent of their age group. By 1960, however, college enrollments had expanded to 3.6 million. By 1970, 7.5 million students were attending colleges in the United States, or 40 percent of college-age youths.

The act, therefore, was designed to fulfill two purposes. First, it was designed to provide the country with specific defense oriented personnel. This included providing federal help to foreign language scholars, area studies centers, and engineering students. Second it provided financial assistance—primarily through the National Defense Student Loan program—for thousands of students who would be part of the growing numbers enrolling at colleges and universities in the 1960s.

NDEA established the National Defense Student Loan (NDSL) program to provide low-interest federal loans to "promising, yet needy students", and to enable them to pursue undergraduate and graduate educations. The national defense student loans were especially targeted toward students who possessed superior capacity in mathematics, engineering, or a modern foreign language or who desired to teach in elementary or secondary schools. A further intention of this loan program was to stimulate and assist in the establishment of loan programs at institutions of higher education through the provision of NDSL loans. The NDEA spurred the creation of federal and university funded college loan programs that still exist today.

The 1959 Disney featurette Donald in Mathmagic Land was produced and distributed with NDEA funding.

== Breakdown by title ==
=== Title I ===
Title I of the NDEA serves as an introduction to the content and purposes of the Act.

=== Title II ===
Title II created the National Defense Student Loan (NDSL) Program, and Title II authorizes the provision of student loans and provides terms by which they may be awarded. These loans were aimed at needy students who had advanced capabilities in science, math, engineering, or foreign languages. Initially, Title II provided scholarships (also known as grants) rather than loans. However, some members of Congress expressed worry about the message sent by giving students a "free ride." The House version of the bill eliminated scholarship money, while the Senate reduced the amount of scholarship money. By the time the bill was passed into law, student aid was exclusively loan-based. Title II also offered a system of loan forgiveness if the student went on to teach in a public elementary or secondary school.

=== Title III ===
The purpose of Title III was to provide matching grants for public schools and to provide loans to nonprofit schools to allow them to get more equipment and materials to provide better instruction in math, science, and foreign languages. These funds were also allowed to be used to remodel some laboratories on school campuses. Title III, though never formally repealed, has not been funded since 1978. Funding for this type of program now falls under the Elementary and Secondary Education Act (ESEA), and the remodeling sections of the act falls under the National Foundation on the Arts and Humanities Act of 1965.

Title III provides additional financial assistance for the purposes of strengthening science, math, and foreign language programs. Latin and Greek programs are not funded under this title, on the grounds that they are not modern foreign languages, and thus do not support defense needs. Title III provides equipment, materials and state matching funds to develop mathematics, science, and foreign language instruction and professional development. Title III also encouraged cooperation between teachers and researchers. During Title III, research shifted the homogenous definition of intelligence associated with gifted children.

=== Title IV ===
Title IV was created with the goals of creating more quality college instructors, increasing the amount of post-graduate and Ph.D. programs across the United States, and allowing more students to attend these programs through federal financial support. Title IV provides funding for graduate fellowships in order to increase the number of graduate-level professionals and university professors. Priority was given to students who stated an interest in becoming a professor. However, certain fields (such as folklore) were specifically exempted from these fellowships. Title IV was also one of the only two federal programs (along with Title VI of the NDEA) in existence at the time that gave any funding to the humanities.

=== Title V ===
Title V includes provisions for the training of guidance counselors and the implementation of testing programs to identify gifted students. This laid the groundwork for Academically Gifted (AG) and Gifted & Talented (GT) programs and began the trend of using standardized testing in schools to measure competency. Title V had a great influence on gifted education. However, since the program started in the 1920s, the defining percentage that marks "giftedness" has remained constant.

=== Title VI ===
Title VI provided funding for the improvement of the teaching of foreign languages at institutions of higher education. Title VI provides funding for language and area studies programs. "Area studies" includes such subjects as African American studies and Latin American studies.

=== Title VII ===
Title VII provided funding for research in the more effective use of technology for educational purposes.

=== Title VIII ===
Title VIII provided funding for vocational training in order to better prepare citizens for the workforce.

=== Title IX ===
Title IX established the Science Information Institute and Science Information Council in order to disseminate scientific information and assist the government in matters of a highly technical nature.

=== Title X ===
Title X contains miscellaneous provisions regarding legal and pragmatic details of the Act.

== Controversy ==
The NDEA includes Title X, Section 1001 (f), a mandate that all beneficiaries of the act complete an affidavit disclaiming belief in the overthrow of the U.S. government. Some in higher education opposed the disclaimer affidavit, as it came to be called, because they said it attempted to control beliefs and as such violated academic freedom. Initially, a small number of institutions (Barnard, Yale, and Princeton) refused to accept funding under the student loan program established by the act because of the affidavit requirement. By 1962, when the disclaimer affidavit was repealed, the number of schools protesting the clause was 153.

After four years of seemingly ineffective protest, the disclaimer requirement was repealed in the Fall of 1962 by President John F. Kennedy who was spurred by an incident extraneous to universities' protests, in particular, following the public disclosure of the case of a National Science Foundation Fellowship recipient who had run into trouble with the House Un-American Activities Committee, and had been convicted of contempt of Congress. Kennedy interpreted this case proved the affidavit clause to be ineffective, and, in spite of—rather than because of—protest prior to 1961, the disclaimer requirement was excised.
