= Drug-free school zone =

Area around schools with enhanced penalties for drug offenses

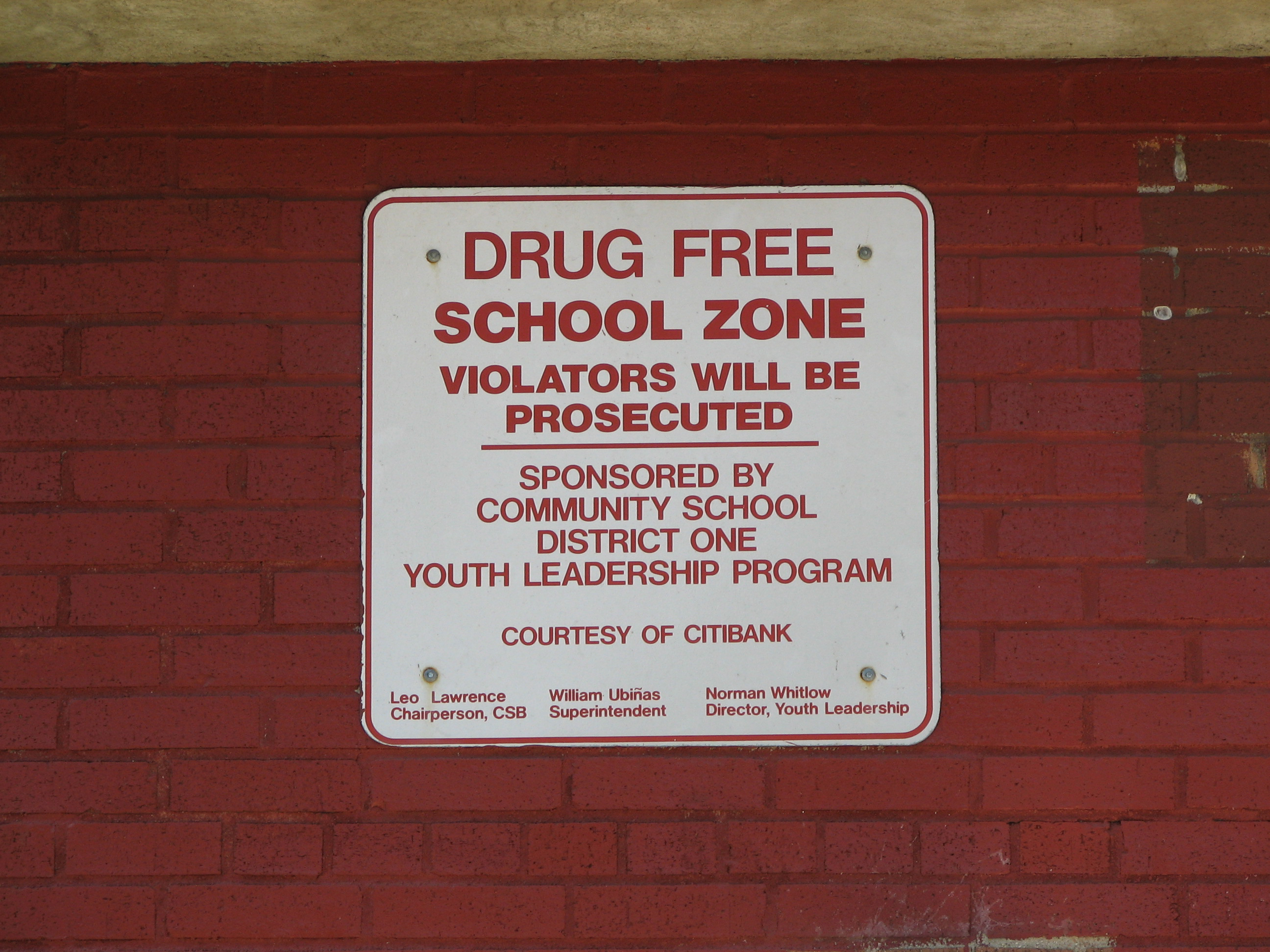
Drug-free school zone sign in New York City, Manhattan

United States Federal law and many state and local laws increase penalties for illegal drug-related activities in drug-free school zones. The penalties vary from jurisdiction to jurisdiction in terms of whether they stand alone as separate offenses or serve as a sentencing enhancement, and in terms of the defenses available.

The United States Congress has supplemented the core offenses under the Controlled Substances Act (21 U.S.C. ' 841) with several additional offenses carrying increased maximum penalties, when the crimes are committed under certain specified circumstances. For example, section 21 U.S.C.'860 provides that the penalties for manufacturing, distributing, and possessing with intent to distribute are doubled or tripled when the offense is committed within a specified distance of a school or other facility regularly used by children. Under Federal law the affected areas can include illegal federal drug sales on, or within one thousand feet of, real property comprising a public or private elementary, vocational, or secondary school or a public or private college, junior college, or university, or a playground, or housing facility owned by a public housing authority, or within 100 feet of a public or private youth center, public swimming pool, or video arcade facility.

In one state, New Hampshire, a drug-free school zone is defined as an area inclusive of any property used for school purposes by any publicly funded primary school, whether or not owned by such school, within 1,000 feet of any such property, and within or immediately adjacent to school buses.

The No Child Left Behind Act amended and reauthorized the Safe and Drug-Free Schools & Communities Act (SDFSCA) as Part A of Title IV-21st century schools. The No Child Left Behind Act authorized funds for SDFSCA program, which is the federal government’s major initiative to prevent drug abuse violence in and around schools. As part of the SDFSCA, Congress allocated millions to school districts to help them establish programs to prevent the use of alcohol and other drugs, but there are no accountability standards to accompany the money. The SDFSCA was established by the Anti-Drug Abuse Act of 1986. The SDFSC Advisory Committee, was appointed by the U.S. Secretary of Education Margaret Spellings. The Committee was established to advise the Secretary on Federal, state, and local programs designated to create safe and drug-free schools, and on issues related to crisis planning.

The purpose of the SDFSCA is to support programs that: (1) prevent violence in and around schools; (2) prevent the illegal use of alcohol, tobacco, and drugs; (3) involve parents and communities; and, (4) are coordinated with related Federal, State, school, and community efforts and resources to foster a safe and drug-free learning environment that promotes student academic achievement.

Due primarily to an ongoing lack of research supporting any of these efforts being an effective deterrent to crime, Congress recently eliminated several programs administered by the Office of Safe and Drug-Free Schools.

== See also ==
- Alcohol-free zone
