= Strengthening Transparency in Higher Education Act =

- Long title: To simplify and streamline the information regarding institutions of higher education made publicly available by the Secretary of Education, and for other purposes.
- Announced in: the 113th United States Congress
- Sponsored by: Rep. Virginia Foxx (R, NC-5)
- Number of co-sponsors: 2

Codification
- U.S.C. sections affected: 20 U.S.C. § 1015a, 20 U.S.C. § 1015, 20 U.S.C. § 1001 et seq.
- Agencies affected: Bureau of Labor Statistics, United States Department of Education, National Center for Education Statistics

Legislative history
- Introduced in the House as H.R. 4983 by Rep. Virginia Foxx (R, NC-5) on June 26, 2014; Committee consideration by United States House Committee on Education and the Workforce; Passed the House on July 23, 2014 (voice vote)

The Strengthening Transparency in Higher Education Act (H.R. 4983) is a bill that would reserve $1 million from funding for the United States Department of Education to replace the current College Navigator website with a new website and change the type of information that the website would need to provide. The bill also would amend the requirements for the department’s net-price calculator, which provides details on the costs of post-secondary education. The purpose of the bill is to help students get the facts they need to make a wise decision about where to go to college.

The bill was introduced into the United States House of Representatives during the 113th United States Congress.

== Provisions of the bill ==
This summary is based largely on the summary provided by the Congressional Research Service, a public domain source.

The Strengthening Transparency in Higher Education Act would amend the Higher Education Act of 1965 (HEA) to eliminate the restriction of college cost calculations to those costs incurred by first-time students.

The bill would eliminate the requirement that the United States Secretary of Education make publicly available on the College Navigator website: (1) college affordability and transparency lists, and (2) state higher education spending charts.

The bill would require that the Secretary develop, annually update, and make publicly available a College Dashboard website that displays the following information regarding each institution of higher education (IHE) participating in the programs under title IV (Student Assistance) of the HEA:

- a link to the IHE's website;
- an identification of the IHE's type;
- the number of students enrolled at the IHE;
- the student-faculty ratio;
- the percentage of degree- or certificate-seeking undergraduate students at the IHE who obtain a certificate within the normal time for completing their program, within 150% of that time period, and within 200% of that time period;
- the average net price per year for undergraduate students at the IHE and a link to the net price calculator for the IHE;
- the average student loan debt incurred by undergraduate students in the course of obtaining a certificate or degree from the IHE;
- the IHE's cohort default rate; and
- a link to national and regional data from the Bureau of Labor Statistics (BLS) on starting salaries in all major occupations.

The bill would direct the Secretary to publish more detailed and disaggregated IHE information regarding student enrollment, completion rates, costs, and use of financial aid on Internet web pages that are linked to through the College Dashboard website.

The bill would require the Secretary to: (1) include on the College Dashboard website a function enabling users to easily compare information between IHEs, and (2) provide each student who submits a Free Application for Federal Student Aid (FAFSA) with a link to the web page of the College Dashboard website that contains information for each IHE on the student's FAFSA.

== Congressional Budget Office report ==
This summary is based largely on the summary provided by the Congressional Budget Office, as ordered reported by the House Committee on Education and the Workforce on July 10, 2014. This is a public domain source.

H.R. 4983 would reserve $1 million from funding for the United States Department of Education to replace the current College Navigator website with a new website and change the type of information that the website would need to provide. The bill also would amend the requirements for the department’s net-price calculator, which provides details on the costs of post-secondary education.

The Congressional Budget Office (CBO) estimates that implementing H.R. 4983 would require $1 million for administrative costs for the department over the 2015-2019 period, assuming the availability of appropriated funds.

Enacting the bill would not affect direct spending or revenues; therefore, pay-as-you-go procedures do not apply.

H.R. 4983 contains no intergovernmental or private-sector mandates as defined in the Unfunded Mandates Reform Act and would impose no costs on state, local, or tribal governments.

== Procedural history ==
The Strengthening Transparency in Higher Education Act was introduced into the United States House of Representatives on June 26, 2014 by Rep. Virginia Foxx (R, NC-5). It was referred to the United States House Committee on Education and the Workforce. It was reported (amended) on July 17, 2014 alongside House Report 113-530. The House voted on July 23, 2014 to pass the bill in a voice vote.

== Debate and discussion ==
The House Education Committee, which passed the bill, described that bill as one that "would improve consumer information to provide a more complete picture of all student populations, streamline existing transparency efforts at the federal level to reduce confusion for students, and require better coordination by federal agencies to avoid duplication and confusion." According to the Committee, the legislation will address the problem of students struggling to choose a college but being unable to sort through all of the available data.

According to Adjunct Action, the bill will "require universities to reveal important information about the working conditions of adjunct faculty, who are now the majority of faculty in higher education." Service Employees International Union International President Mary Kay Henry supported the bill, saying that "it's good to see Congress is interested in shining a spotlight on trends in higher education that have marginalized contingent and part-time faculty."

== See also ==
- List of bills in the 113th United States Congress
- Education in the United States
