= Dry zone =

Dry zone may refer to:

- Alcohol-free zone, a location where the public consumption and sale of alcoholic beverages is prohibited
- Dry Zone (Myanmar), a geographical region of Myanmar
- Sri Lanka dry-zone dry evergreen forests, a geographical region of Sri Lanka
