= Westside High School (Omaha) =

Coordinates: 41°14′50″N 96°3′0″W

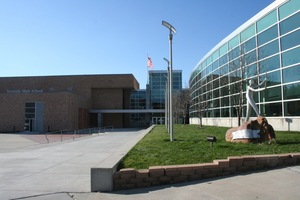
- Front view of the Westside campus
- 8701 Pacific St. Omaha, Nebraska, 68114-5298

Information
- Type: Public
- Established: 1951
- Principal: Jay Dostal
- Teaching staff: 135.07 (FTE)
- Enrollment: 2,138 (2023–2024)
- Student to teacher ratio: 15.83
- Colors: Red, white, and black
- Team name: Warriors
- Website: https://whs.westside66.org/

Westside High School is the only high school of the Westside Community Schools district of Omaha, Nebraska, United States.

== History ==
In 2021, Westside High School, has an indoor golf facility called the Swede Center. It includes putting and chipping areas, two hitting bays, a players’ lounge, and a locker room. The facility cost $350,000 and was funded by 61 donors.

== Student life ==
=== Modular schedule system ===
Westside has used a modular schedule since 1967. Each module, or "mod" (as known colloquially among WHS students), is either a 20 or 40-minute period used for classes or independent study time in an instructional materials center (IMC). This allows freedom in scheduling as classes can be 40, 60, or 80 minutes long, as needed for one-to-one, small group, large group, and laboratory instruction. Classes are taught in a similar format to many universities; students typically meet a large group lecture once per week and have small group recitations throughout the week. An average student has at least one or two open mods per day, to be used for studying, interacting with teachers, eating lunch, or socializing. Students who have met specific requirements are eligible to apply for a pass that allows them to leave the building during open mods.

== Supreme Court case ==
In 1985, Westside Senior Bridget Mergens was denied the ability to create an after-school Christian Bible club. The principal at the time rejected the idea since he said a religious club violated the First Amendment's Establishment Clause. In addition, the club lacked a school sponsor that was required when forming a club. Mergens argued that the district's decision was in violation of the federal Equal Access Act requiring that groups seeking to express messages containing “religious, political, philosophical, or other content” not be denied the ability to form clubs. The case was initially ruled in favor of the school by the District Court, being over turned in the Court of Appeals. The Supreme Court granted Westside certiorari, following appeal.

In 1990, Westside Community Board of Education v. Mergens was heard by the Supreme Court. In an 8–1 decision, the court said that since the club did not study school curriculum, it was permitted under the Equal Access Act. Supreme Court of the United States decided in favour of Mergens in Westside School District v. Mergens saying that in distinguishing between "curriculum" and "noncurriculum student groups," the Court held that since Westside permitted other noncurricular clubs, it was prohibited under the Equal Access Act from denying equal access to any after-school club based on the content of its speech. The proposed Christian club would be a noncurriculum group since no other course required students to become its members, its subject matter would not actually be taught in classes, it did not concern the school's cumulative body of courses, and its members would not receive academic credit for their participation. The Court added that the Equal Access Act was constitutional because it served an overriding secular purpose by prohibiting discrimination on the basis of philosophical, political, or other types of speech. As such, the Act protected the Christian club's formation even if its members engaged in religious discussions.

== Extracurricular activities ==
Westside athletic teams have won the following state championships.

State championships
Season	Sport	Number of championships	Year
Fall	Football	6	1961, 1981, 1982, 2020, 2022, 2023
Fall	Tennis, boys'	4	1976, 1977, 1981, 1983
Fall	Golf, girls'	1	1990
Winter	Wrestling	2	1976, 1977
Winter	Basketball, girls'	3	1999, 2015, 2018
Winter	Basketball, boys'	1	1980
Winter	Swimming, boys'	23	1966, 1967, 1968, 1970, 1971, 1972, 1973, 1974, 1975, 1976, 1978, 1979, 1980, 1981, 1982, 1983, 1984, 1985, 1986, 1991, 2004, 2005, 2006
Winter	Swimming, girls'	14	1975, 1976, 1977, 1978, 1979, 1984, 1985, 1986, 1987, 1988, 1995, 1996, 2012, 2023
Spring	Golf, boys'	7	1959, 1966, 1970, 1974, 1989, 2023, 2024
Spring	Track and field, boys'	2	1967, 1975
Spring	Soccer, boys'	3	1998, 2004, 2025
Spring	Tennis, girls'	17	1976, 1977, 1978, 1979, 1980, 1982, 1986, 1987, 1996, 1998, 1999, 2003, 2004, 2005, 2007, 2012, 2014
Spring	Baseball	8	1972, 1999, 2003, 2006, 2009, 2013, 2014, 2015
Total		91	

== Notable alumni ==
- Kurt Andersen, writer
- Brad Ashford, U.S. Representative for Nebraska's 2nd congressional district (elected 2014)
- Clark Baechle, member of The Faint
- Bill Danenhauer, professional wrestler and football player/coach
- Avante Dickerson, college football cornerback for the Arkansas State Red Wolves
- Todd Fink, member of The Faint
- Pat Fischer, professional football player (Washington Commanders)
- Channing Gibson, screenwriter
- Bennett Greenspan, businessman and entrepreneur
- Tim Halperin, musician, and Top 24 American Idol contestant (2011)
- Drew Hancock, filmmaker and actor
- Nick Hexum, member of 311
- Michael J. Hopkins, mathematician
- Eva Houston, 2x Paralympic track athlete for Team USA (Tokyo 2020 & Paris 2024)
- Magnolia Howell, professional Track & Field runner for Trinidad and Tobago, journalist and fine artist
- Jaime King, actress and model
- Terry Kiser, actor
- Joseph Limprecht, United States Ambassador to Albania
- Jake Meyers, professional baseball player, Houston Astros
- Nick Nolte (1959), actor
- Cole Payton, NFL quarterback for the Philadelphia Eagles
- Adeev and Ezra Potash, identical twin musicians and television personalities
- Pete Ricketts, 40th governor of Nebraska; U.S. Senator; former Chief Operating Officer of TD Ameritrade
- Darin Ruf, professional baseball player, Milwaukee Brewers
- Dave Stryker, American Jazz Guitarist
- Virginia Lamp Thomas, lawyer and consultant
