= Presidential Award for Excellence in Mathematics and Science Teaching =

American teaching award

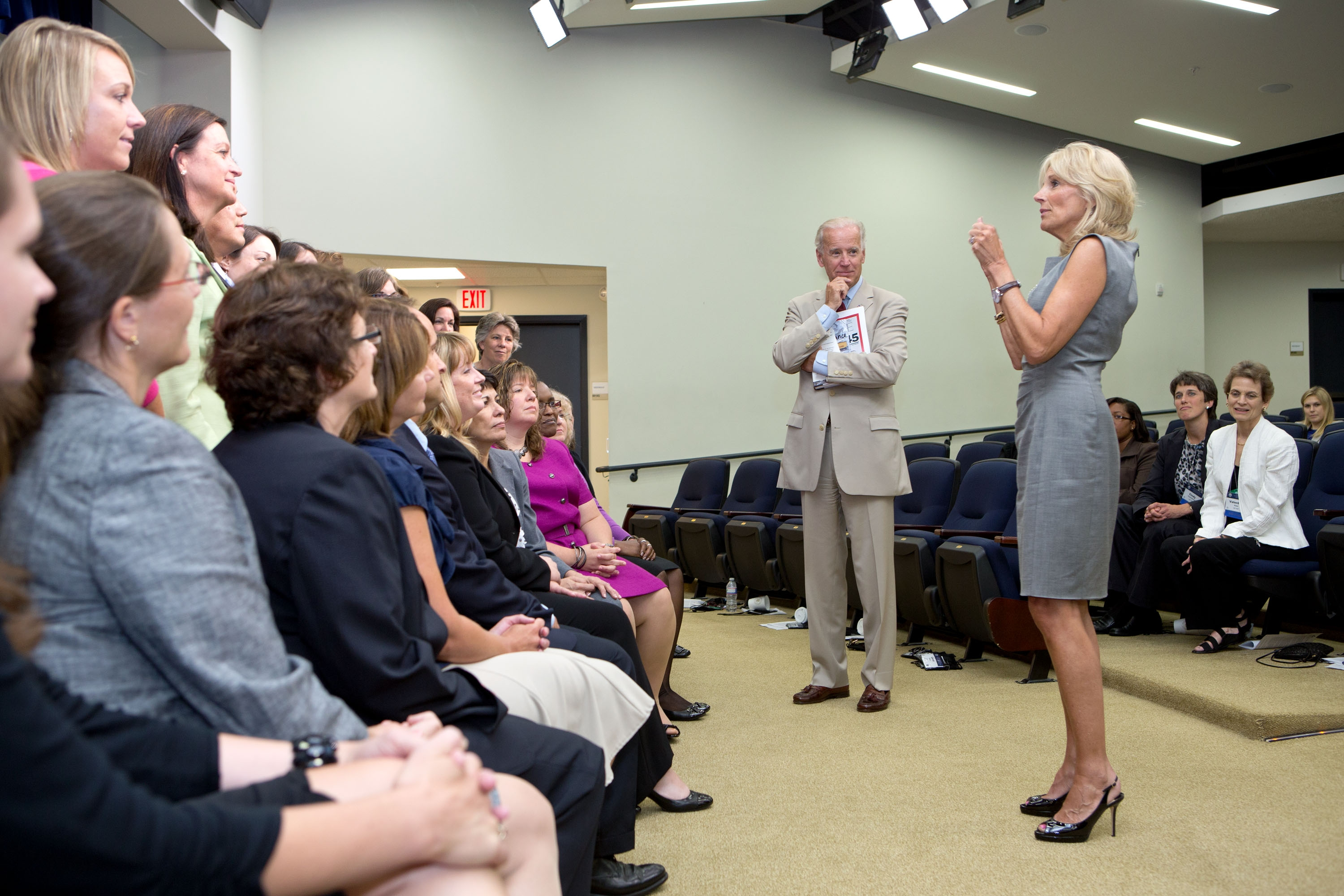
- Vice President Joe Biden and Jill Biden greet winners of the Presidential Award (2012)
- Awarded for: Outstanding teaching
- Date: 1984
- Location: The White House
- Country: United States
- Presented by: President of the United States
- Website: Official website

The Presidential Award for Excellence in Mathematics and Science Teaching (PAEMST) is the highest recognition that a kindergarten through 12th-grade mathematics or science teacher may receive for outstanding teaching in the United States. Authorized by the Education for Economic Security Act in 1984, this program authorizes the President to bestow up to 108 awards each year. The National Science Foundation (NSF) administers PAEMST on behalf of The White House Office of Science and Technology Policy.

== Eligibility ==
The following are the eligibility criteria for nominees. They must:

- Be highly qualified teachers, as deemed by their states, districts, or schools; teachers in private/independent schools should meet the spirit of the principles and provisions of the No Child Left Behind Act, Public Law 107-110.
- Hold a degree or appropriate credentials in the category for which they are applying.
- Teach in one of the 50 states or four U.S. jurisdictions. The jurisdictions are Washington, D.C., Puerto Rico, Department of Defense Schools, and the U.S. territories as a group (American Samoa, Guam, the Commonwealth of the Northern Mariana Islands, and the U.S. Virgin Islands).
- Be full-time employees of the school or school district.
- Have at least 5 years of mathematics or science teaching experience prior to application.
- Teach mathematics or science at the appropriate grade level in a public or private school. The award is made to teachers of kindergarten through 6th grades and 7th through 12 grades in alternate years.
- Not have received the national PAEMST award in any prior competition or category.

== See also ==
- Awards and decorations of the United States government
- List of mathematics awards
