= Mental health provisions in Title V of the No Child Left Behind Act of 2001 =

== Mental Health Provisions in the No Child Left Behind Act ==
As part of the No Child Left Behind Act of 2001, the United States Congress passed into law two subparts of Part D of Title V (Promoting Informed Parental Choice and Innovative Programs). This pertains to mental health interventions as they relate to students, such as school counseling. Those subparts are:

- Subpart 2, Section 5241: Elementary and Secondary School Counseling Programs
- Subpart 14, Section 5541: Grants for the Integration of Schools and Mental Health Systems
- Section 5542: Promotion of School Readiness through Early Childhood Emotional and Social Development.

== Subpart 2, Section 5241: Elementary and Secondary School Counseling Programs ==
This section authorizes the Secretary of Education to award grants to local education agencies (LEAs) for the purpose of establishing or expanding counseling services for students in elementary and secondary school settings. This section also delineates the conditions under which LEAs should be given special consideration by the Secretary of Education. Those conditions are:

1. Demonstration of great need (determined in part by student-to-counselor, student-to-social-worker, and student-to-school-psychologist ratios).
2. Proposal of new programs or those with documented outcomes.
3. Demonstration of great possibilities for replication and dissemination.

This section also requires that the counseling services for which funds are provided follow certain guidelines, including assurances that funds will:

- Be spent on programs that will be comprehensive in their approach.
- Serve the needs of all students.
- Increase the availability of services.
- Employ qualified professionals.
- Be inclusive of families and communities.
- Be evaluated on the outcomes of the programs.
- Be shown to be used in an innovative approach to providing services.

The section also requires that the office of the Secretary of Education must make a report evaluating the programs that receive funds under the section.

== Subpart 14, Section 5541: Grants for the Integration of Schools and Mental Health Systems ==
This section gives the Secretary of Education authority to award grants to and enter into contracts with a Local Education Agency, State Education Agency, and to support programs that expand student access to mental health care through the creation of links between schools and the community mental health system. These grants are awarded based on an application process. The section limits these grants to a five-year period and requires that the funds be used by LEAs to expand or improve care for students as well as to provide:

- Training for school-based and community-based professionals (both educators and mental health service providers).
- Consultation and technical assistance for schools and agencies.
- Coordination of services that will fit students' language and cultural background.
- Evaluation of the programs for which grant money is provided.

== Section 5542: Promotion of School Readiness through Early Childhood Emotional and Social Development ==
This section empowers the Secretary of Education to award Foundations for Learning Grants to LEAs and community-based organizations, such as councils or nonprofits, focused on preparing students for school. These grants are application-based and must target programs that support students’ emotional, social, and behavioral development; coordinate family involvement with community programs providing these services; offer supplementary services, such as transportation; evaluate the effectiveness of such programs; or fund students’ participation in or eligibility assessments for these programs. Other requirements for these grants include that programs must not also be receiving funds from other sources and that the office of the Secretary of Education must evaluate or contract for an outside evaluation for each program that receives a grant.

== Context for the Provisions ==
In an article about the connections between school mental health services and No Child Left Behind from November 2006, Brian P. Daly et al. cited a National Institute of Mental Health study that found that between 5% and 9% of students face emotional and behavioral issues that impede their learning. Beyond this, a report by the Centers for Disease Control and Prevention on the interaction between school policies and health for adolescents noted in 2008 that some twenty percent of students annually demonstrate evidence of experiencing a mental health issue. Additionally, the Department of Education, in its application materials for its program of Grants for the Integration of Schools and Mental Health Systems, notes that the majority of mental, emotional, and behavioral disorders have their foundation in childhood or adolescence. They report that more than half of adults who have experienced a mental, emotional, or behavioral disorder claim that it began during those early years and that by the age of sixteen nearly forty percent of children and young adults have experienced a psychiatric disorder. Furthermore, the Department of Education reports that research suggests a correlation between mental health concerns and school-based issues, such as bullying. In their Introduction, the Department of Education cites one study that showed that both perpetrators and victims of incidents of bullying were twice as likely to report symptoms of depression than other students.

In its report on the interaction of school policy and health issues for adolescents, the CDC notes that the state of mental health systems treatment in schools or coordinated by schools is much more extensive today than it once was. It notes that while in the past such services had been given to students in special education, one report by the Substance Abuse and Mental Health Services Administration found through surveys that virtually all schools surveyed had at least one professional on staff to provide mental health services and that upwards of eighty percent of the schools surveyed provided mental health and related behavioral and crisis intervention assessments. Additionally, the American Counseling Association (ACA) reports that in 1998 the ratio of students to counselors in schools was 561:1, but that by 2008-09 that ratio had lessened to 457:1.

Evaluations of the mental health system have identified various barriers to care. In 2002, the President's New Freedom Commission on Mental Health evaluated the current system of mental health in the United States. A 2002 commission report stated that barriers existed to providing mental health care. Furthermore, in an article regarding the role of schools in mental health services, Sharon Hoover Stephan et al. reported that the number of people who seek treatment for mental health disorders is fewer than 30%. Finally, despite improvement in the ratios of students to counselors in schools, the 2008-9 ratio of 457:1 still greatly exceeds the ratio recommended by the American School Counselor Association, which is 250:1.
