= Highly qualified teachers =

The highly qualified teacher provision is one of the goals of the No Child Left Behind Act (NCLB) of 2001. The term highly qualified teachers (HQT) comes from the original language of Title II (Preparing, Training, and Recruiting High Quality Teachers and Principals) of the No Child Left Behind Act. Title II of NCLB designates federal funds to educational agencies for the purpose of improving the student achievement through the professional development of highly qualified teachers and principals. To qualify for this funding, states must comply with a series of conditions stipulated in NCLB, and track their progress toward goals each state sets. Title II was originally known as the Eisenhower Professional Development Program, and has undergone several reauthorizations, though the original intent has remained relatively intact. The main goals of the highly qualified teacher provision is to ensure that every classroom is staffed by a teacher deemed "highly qualified" under conditions set by NCLB. As some point out (e.g., Eric Hanushek), this section of NCLB is quite at odds with the general thrust of NCLB because it focuses on school inputs rather than student outcomes. The sections of NCLB designated to HQTs allocates the majority of the funds to the states and does not clearly define at the federal level what is and what is not a highly qualified teacher, allowing for more local definitions of this term. This provision has come under much scrutiny, as it is up to states to decide how to measure highly qualified, and states are not holding their teachers to the same level of rigor across the country. Since its reauthorization in 2001, Title II has yet to reach its stated goal of ensuring that 100% of teachers in public schools in the United States are highly qualified.

== Brief overview of NCLB ==
The Elementary and Secondary Education Act of 1965 (ESEA) was reauthorized in 2001 under the administration of former president George W. Bush and renamed the No Child Left Behind Act (NCLB). The ultimate goal of this act is to "To close the achievement gap with accountability, flexibility, and choice, so that no child is left behind." It is organized into ten "titles", each of which details one particular aspect of the goals of the act, and explains how funds will be allocated to State education agencies (SEAs), local education agencies (LEAs), and State agencies for higher education (SAHEs). Title II, Preparing, Training, and Recruiting High Quality Teachers and Principals, focuses specifically on improving the quality of teachers and principals in publicly funded schools and created the term highly qualified teacher (HQT). Title II of No Child Left Behind aimed to have a highly qualified teacher in every classroom in the United States by 2005. It also gives states greater freedom on spending as it relates to teacher qualify, in the hopes that schools will be able to retain their highly qualified teachers.

== History of teacher quality reform: 1965–2001 ==
When the Elementary and Secondary Education Act was first created, Title II was known as the Eisenhower Mathematics and Science Regional Consortiums Program. Its goals were to provide financial assistance to states to support the professional development of their math and science teachers. In 1984, this was reauthorized as the Dwight D. Eisenhower Mathematics and Science Education Program under Title II, Part A of the ESEA, and funding for the program began in 1985. It was developed in the wake of the Nation at Risk Report of 1983 to allocate funds to educational agencies and non-profits through the states. In particular, the Eisenhower Program focused on the professional development of math and science teachers, as the findings of A Nation at Risk indicated that the United States was falling drastically behind the rest of the world in these fields. This report, issued by former President Ronald Reagan, made a series of recommendations to improve the quality of education across the United States based on its findings. One of these recommendations was improved teaching. The report found that teachers were not adequately trained, not well paid, and were not qualified to teach their subject area. The report recommended school boards should hold teachers to higher expectations, teacher training programs should be improved, and that teacher salaries and incentives should be increased.

Reauthorization through the Eisenhower Program built off of the recommendations of the Nation At Risk Report and expanded the focus of professional development to include all core subject areas. The original goals of the program were to support the professional development of teachers of core subject, target those teachers who teach "at-risk" students, integrate other reform efforts to ensure all aspect of the education system were geared toward the same goals, and track the progress of states and local education agencies against a series of performance indicators. States were required to measure their performance using a series of six objectives aimed to develop highly qualified teachers and a system of highly qualified teachers. When ESEA was reauthorized in 1994, this program was also reauthorized and renamed the Eisenhower Professional Development Program. Finally, in 2001 with the latest reauthorization and rename of ESEA, the Eisenhower Program was renamed Title II: Preparing, Training, and Recruiting High Quality Teachers and Principals.

Currently, it is the job of the states to define what it means to be "highly qualified" and to monitor their own progress. States are required to complete and submit three annual reports on the progress they are making. Schools of education need to report their graduation pass rates for teacher certification to the state in April. States then report "information on certification and licensure requirements, pass rates on state assessments disaggregated and ranked by institution, and other information" to the U.S. Department of Education in October. The U.S. Secretary of Education then releases an Annual Report on Teacher Quality which synthesizes this data.

== Summary of Title II ==
The purpose of Title II funding is to provide federal grants to State education agencies (SEAs), local education agencies (LEAs), and State agencies for higher education (SAHEs) in order to (Section 2101):

1. increase student academic achievement through strategies such as improving teacher and principal quality and increasing the number of highly qualified teachers in the classroom and highly qualified principals and assistant principals in schools; and
2. hold local educational agencies and schools accountable for improvements in student academic achievement.

Part A, Subpart 1, which includes Section 2102 and 2103, define terms and authorizes the appropriations of these funds to state, LEAs, and other partners.

Subpart 2 (Sections 2111–2113) of Title II details how grants will be disbursed to the states. It explains specifically how the law determines the allotment of funds to each state, the conditions with which the state must comply in order to apply for and be approved for funding, and how the states may use the funds. States must provide a detailed description of how they will use the money, and what they will do to monitor their progress toward becoming "highly qualified." The law also explains that 95% of the grant must go directly to the local education agencies in the form of subgrants. The remaining 5% of funds are to be used for other partnerships and other state activities which may require funding. However, the majority of the grant money is distributed to LEAs for the improvement of teacher quality.

Subpart 3 (Sections 2121–2123) focus specifically on the LEAs' use of funds. It explains that to be eligible for the funds, LEAs must apply to the state and specify: what activities they plan to use the money for, how these activities are scientifically based in research that shows they will have a positive impact on teacher performance and student academic achievement, how the LEA plans on targeting teachers of at-risk students, what professional development to teachers and principals they will offer, how the LEA will integrate technology, the results, and any additional training that may be provided to teachers. It specifies that the use of these funds should be to recruit and develop highly qualified teachers, and then create mechanisms to retain these teachers in the schools. LEAs should also provide professional development and incentivize teacher retention.

Subpart 4 describes the measures states will take to hold themselves and LEAs accountable for the use of this grant money. Subpart 5 of Part A of Title II describes the National Activities that will take place surrounding HQTs.

A full outline of Parts A, B (Mathematics and Science Partnerships), and Part C (Innovation for Teacher Quality) can be found on the U.S. Department of Education's website.

== Initial Reactions to 2001 Reauthorization of Title II ==
When the Elementary and Secondary Education Act (ESEA) was reauthorized as No Child Left Behind (NCLB) in 2001, it called for major improvements in teacher quality across the board. Teacher quality has long been regarded as the essential component when it comes to factors that affect a student's education. Indeed, the Coleman Report claimed this to be true in 1966, and subsequent studies have reported this research. Excellent teaching can result in more than one year's growth of education, while poor quality teaching can result in loss of years of learning. Given the strength of these findings, it is not surprising that NCLB chose to focus on improving teacher quality. Indeed, the 2001 act included statues that required for 100% of core subject classes be taught by highly qualified teachers by the close of the 2005–2006 academic year. It required states to create and to publish their plans for achieving this goal. It also required for states to track their progress towards this goal, and to publish the progress every year.

== State failures to meet performance criteria ==
States did not hit the 100% highly qualified mark by the end of the 2006 academic year. However, by end of the 2009–2010 academic year, the Department of Education reported that 98% of elementary core classes were taught by HQTs and 96% of secondary core classes were taught by HQTs. 41 of 50 states reported an increase in the overall percentage of HQTs from the 2003–2004 academic year to the 2009–2010 academic year. Furthermore, 13 states reported 99% of core classes were taught by HQTs. However, the Department of Education also reported that low-poverty schools had a greater percentage of HQTs than high-poverty schools in 47 of 50 states.

== Controversies and debates about teacher quality ==
According to NCLB, a highly qualified teacher must have "1) a bachelor's degree, 2) full state certification or licensure, and 3) prove that they know each subject they teach." Beyond that, NCLB does not define its terminology, and it leaves requirements up the states. States are allowed the liberty to determine how teachers can prove their content knowledge. Many states have chosen to approach this issue with standardized content exams. However, the exams, themselves, are not standardized. This means that "qualification" has a different meaning in each state. A teacher who may be deemed "highly qualified" by Alabama standards, may not be deemed "highly qualified" by California standards. Some scholars point out that "from a practical standpoint, interstate differences in what it meant to be certified provided the federal government with few assurances that, across the board, the nations' teachers were qualified to teach". There is also widespread disagreement about what it means to be a highly qualified teacher.

According to the National Commission on Teaching and America's future, HQTs should "graduate from accredited institutions, pass licensing examinations that include both content and performance components, and be certified when they obtain advanced levels of competence". While others point out that standardized test scores and prestigious degrees neither effectively prepare HQTs for the classroom nor capture the qualities necessary to be an effective teacher.

== Where states are today ==
Ultimately, while the Department of Education may state 97% coverage of HQTs in core content classrooms, the true meaning of "qualified" remains vague and transient.

== See also ==
- Education reform
- No Child Left Behind Act
- Race to the Top
