= Westside Community Board of Education v. Mergens =

- Supreme Court of the United States

Argued January 9, 1990 Decided June 4, 1990
- Full case name: Board of Education of the Westside Community Schools, etc., et al., Petitioners v. Bridget C. Mergens, by and through her next friend, Daniel N. Mergens, et al.
- Citations: 496 U.S. 226 (more) 110 S. Ct. 2356; 110 L. Ed. 2d 191; 1990 U.S. LEXIS 2880; 58 U.S.L.W. 4720
- Argument: Oral argument

Case history
- Prior: 867 F.2d 1076 (8th Cir. 1989); cert. granted, 492 U.S. 917 (1989).

Holding
- School districts may not prohibit Bible study groups from meeting on school premises if they allow other groups to meet on school premises.

Court membership
- Chief Justice William Rehnquist Associate Justices William J. Brennan Jr. · Byron White; Thurgood Marshall · Harry Blackmun; John P. Stevens · Sandra Day O'Connor; Antonin Scalia · Anthony Kennedy

Case opinions
- Majority: O'Connor (parts I, II-A, II-B, II-C), joined by Rehnquist, White, Blackmun, Scalia, Kennedy
- Plurality: O'Connor (part III), joined by Rehnquist, White, Blackmun
- Concurrence: Kennedy (in part and in judgement), joined by Scalia
- Concurrence: Marshall (in judgement), joined by Brennan
- Dissent: Stevens

Laws applied
- U.S. Const. amend. I; Equal Access Act

Westside Community Board of Education v. Mergens, 496 U.S. 226 (1990), was a United States Supreme Court case involving a school district's ability to hold classes on Bible study after school.

== Background ==
Westside High School, in District 66, located in Omaha, Nebraska, refused to allow a group of students to form a Christian Bible Study Club within their school. Bridget Mergens is the name of the student who initiated the process to start the club. She was a senior at the time. It was decided that the club could not take place because they would not allow a staff member to sponsor it (staff sponsoring was required or the club meetings could not take place at the school). The students argued that the district's decision was in violation of the federal Equal Access Act requiring that groups seeking to express messages containing "religious, political, philosophical, or other content" not be denied the ability to form clubs.

== Opinion of the Court ==
In an 8–1 decision, the Court held that denying equal access to the religious club violated the Equal Access Act, and that treating a religious club equally, including providing a sponsor like other clubs, would not constitute an endorsement of religion prohibited by the Establishment Clause of the First Amendment.

The school's situation was placed under the Equal Access Act because it allowed other ‘limited open forums’. In Part III of Justice O'Connor's opinion, which did not reach a majority of the Court, she applied the Lemon Test to find that the Equal Access Act is constitutional as applied in this case. Justice Kennedy, meanwhile, analyzed the application of the Act under different Court precedents, focusing more upon "coercion".

=== Dissent ===
Justice Stevens, in a dissenting opinion, would have avoided the Establishment Clause issue.

== See also ==
- List of United States Supreme Court cases, volume 496
- List of United States Supreme Court cases
- Lists of United States Supreme Court cases by volume
- List of United States Supreme Court cases by the Rehnquist Court
