= Star Schools Program =

United States government program

The Star Schools Program is a United States government program created to honor schools. Established as part of the United States Department of Education in 1988, the purpose of this program is to:

- Encourage improved instruction in mathematics, science, foreign languages, and other subjects.
- Serve underserved populations, including disadvantaged, non-reading, and limited English proficient populations and individuals with disabilities. Star Schools grants are made to eligible telecommunications partnerships, to enable such partnerships to:
  - develop, construct, acquire, maintain, and operate telecommunications audio and visual facilities and equipment;
  - develop and acquire educational and instructional programming; and
  - obtain technical assistance for the use of such facilities and instructional programming.

== See also ==
- United States Department of Education
- Education for Economic Security Act
- No Child Left Behind
