= Westside Community Schools =

School district in Nebraska, United States

Westside Community Schools, also known locally as District 66, is the third largest school district in Omaha, Nebraska, United States. The district has one high school, one middle school, ten elementary schools, and one alternative high school. The district is in the center-west part of Omaha, between the Omaha Public Schools district and the Millard Public Schools district. Westside also has over 2,000 "opt-in" students, with most coming from OPS.

== History ==
In 1946, residents of four rural school districts located in what was then farming areas to the west of Omaha began holding discussions about combining resources, which led to a proposal to merge the four districts. In 1947, three of the districts—Districts 31, 46 and 65—agreed to merge to create District 66. A junior-senior high school for the district was founded in 1952 where Westside High School is located today.

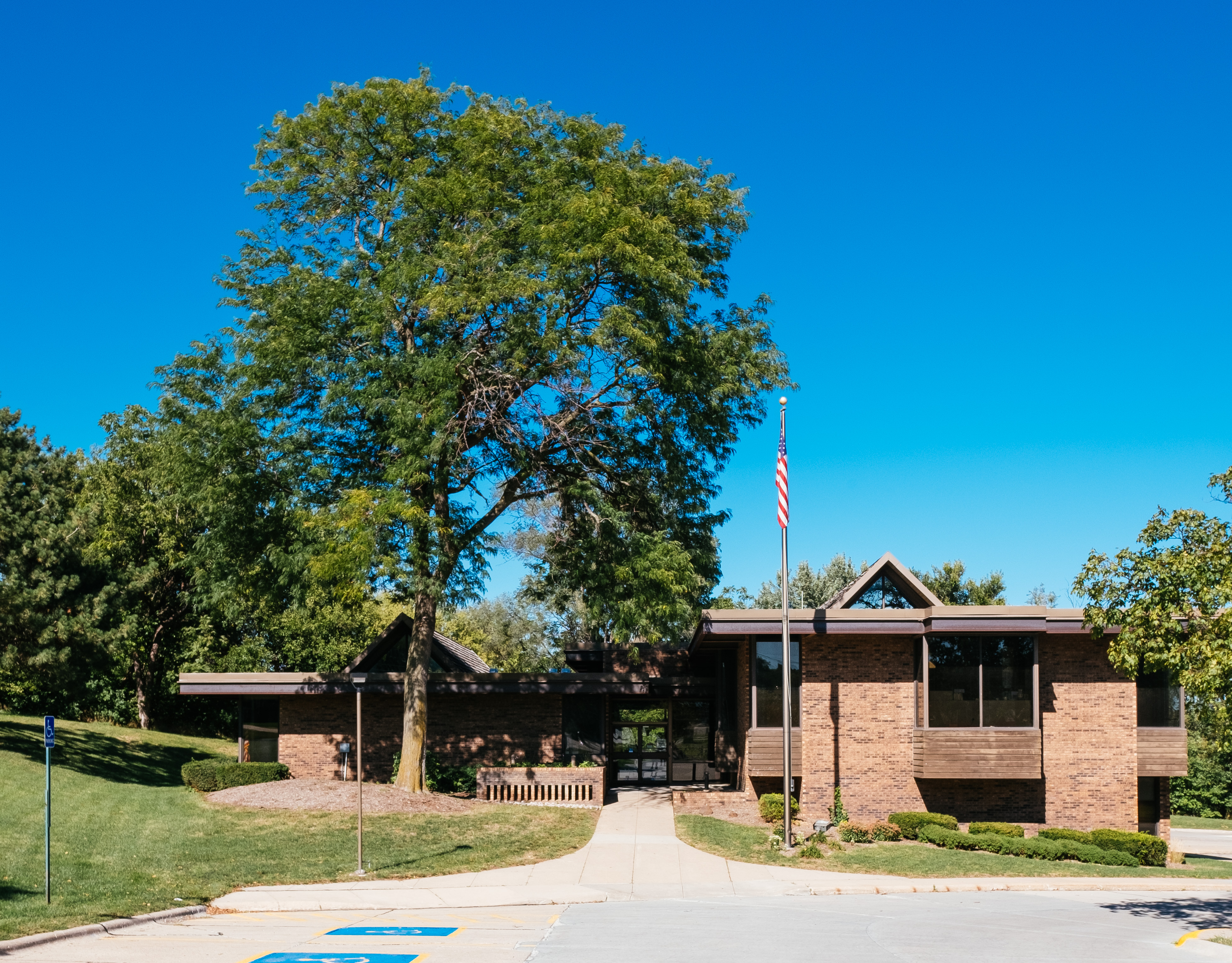
Westside Schools district office

== Recent events ==
The high school, Westside High School, has purchased about 2,000 MacBook computers in the "1:1 Initiative". Each high school student is issued one at the beginning of the year. They are used by students throughout the school year, and then returned at the end of this time. The intent of the initiative was to offer each student the same technological opportunities. Westside Middle School followed in the footsteps of the high school and bought about 1,000 computers for the 7th and 8th graders, with the same rules and constraints as the high school students. Elementary school students also have access to MacBook computers, as well as iPads.

In 2012, the board of education announced that Dr. Blane McCann had been selected as superintendent.

In 2021 the school issued an apology after their "quote of the day" program included a saying by Adolf Hitler.

== Schools ==
School	Mascot	Location	Principal	Enrollment	Opened
Westside High School	Warriors	8701 Pacific Street	Jay Dostal	2138	1967
Westside Middle School	Warriors	8601 Arbor Street	Kim Eymann	939	1987
Carl A Swanson Elementary School	Superstars	410 South 86th Street	Jennifer Harr	289	1958
Hillside Elementary School	Tigers	7500 Western Avenue	Michelle Patterson	381	1955
Loveland Elementary School	Lynx	8201 Pacific Street	Stephanie Hornung	287	1947
Oakdale Elementary School	Tigers	9801 West Center Road	Glen Jagels	308	1927
Paddock Road Elementary School	Pandas	3535 Paddock Road	Quinn McGuire	288	1968
Prairie Lane Elementary School	Panthers	11444 Hascall Street	Belinda Westfall	269	1963
Rockbrook Elementary School	Bulldogs	2514 South 108th Street	Garret Higginbotham	278	1960
Sunset Hills Elementary School	Tigers	9503 Walnut Street	Kira Mclean	289	1956
Westbrook Elementary School	Wildcats	1312 Robertson Drive	Brian Stevens	549	2005
Westgate Elementary School	Gators	7802 Hascall Street	Scott Becker	304	1957

== See also ==
- Education in Omaha, Nebraska
- Westside School District v. Mergens
