= Improving America's Schools Act of 1994 =

- Other short titles: Alaska Native Educational Equity, Support and Assistance Act; Albert Einstein Distinguished Educator Fellowship Act of 1994; Community School Partnership Act; Education Infrastructure Act of 1994; Elementary Mathematics and Science Equipment Act; Equity in Athletics Disclosure Act; Equity in Educational Land-Grant Status Act of 1994; Families of Children with Disabilities Support Act of 1994; Foreign Language Assistance Act of 1994; Gun-Free Schools Act of 1994; Howard M. Metzenbaum Multiethnic Placement Act of 1994; Jacob K. Javits Gifted and Talented Students Education Act of 1994; National Education Statistics Act of 1994; National Teacher Training Project Act of 1994; Native Hawaiian Education Act; Safe and Drug-Free Schools and Communities Act of 1994; School Dropout Assistance Act; Star Schools Act; Technology for Education Act of 1994; Women's Educational Equity Act of 1994; Workers Technology Skill Development Act
- Long title: An Act to extend for six years the authorizations of appropriations for the programs under the Elementary and Secondary Education Act of 1965 and for other purposes.
- Acronyms (colloquial): IASA, 21st CCLCA
- Nicknames: 21st Century Community Learning Centers Act
- Enacted by: the 103rd United States Congress
- Effective: October 20, 1994

Citations
- Public law: 103-382
- Statutes at Large: 108 Stat. 3518

Codification
- Acts amended: Elementary and Secondary Education Act of 1965
- Titles amended: 20 U.S.C.: Education
- U.S.C. sections amended: 20 U.S.C. ch. 70, subch. I § 6301 et seq.

Legislative history
- Introduced in the House as H.R. 6 by Dale Kildee (D–MI) on January 5, 1993; Committee consideration by House Education and Labor, Senate Labor and Human Resources; Passed the House on March 24, 1994 (289–128, Roll call vote 095, via Clerk.House.gov); Passed the Senate on August 2, 1994 (94–6, Roll call vote 252, via Senate.gov, in lieu of S. 1513); Reported by the joint conference committee on September 28, 1994; agreed to by the House on September 30, 1994 (262–132, Roll call vote 456, via Clerk.House.gov) and by the Senate on October 5, 1994 (77–20, Roll call vote 321, via Senate.gov); Signed into law by President Bill Clinton on October 20, 1994

The Improving America's Schools Act of 1994 (IASA) was a major part of the Clinton administration's efforts to reform education. It was signed in the gymnasium of Framingham High School (MA). It reauthorized the Elementary and Secondary Education Act of 1965.

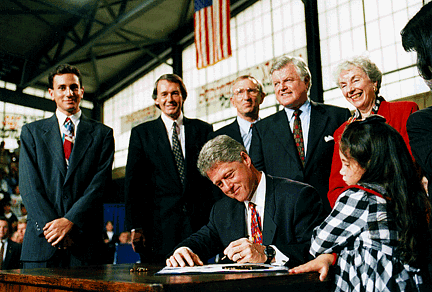
President Bill Clinton signs the act at Framingham High School, October 1994.

It included provisions or reforms for:

- The Title 1 program, providing extra help to disadvantaged students and holding schools accountable for their results at the same level as other students
- Charter schools
- Safe and Drug-free schools
- Eisenhower Professional Development
- Major increases in bilingual and immigrant education funding
- Impact aid
- Education technology and other programs.

== Sections of the Law ==
Title I--Helping Disadvantaged Children Meet High Standards
Title II—Dwight D. Eisenhower Professional Development Program
Title III—Technology For Education
Title IV—Safe And Drug-Free Schools And Communities
Title V--Promoting Equity
Title VI—Innovative Education Program Strategies
Title VII—Bilingual Education, Language Enhancement, And Language Acquisition Programs
Title VIII—Impact Aid
Title IX—Indian, Native Hawaiian, And Alaska Native Education
Title X--Programs Of National Significance
Title XI—Coordinated Services
Title XII—School Facilities Infrastructure Improvement Act
Title XIII—Support And Assistance Programs To Improve Education
Title XIV—General Provisions
