= Education for Economic Security Act =

1984 United States education law

- Long title: An act to provide assistance to improve elementary, secondary, and postsecondary education in mathematics and science; to provide a national policy for engineering, technical, and scientific personnel; to provide cost sharing by the private sector in training such personnel; to encourage creation of new engineering, technical, and scientific jobs, and for other purposes.
- Enacted by: the 98th United States Congress
- Effective: August 11, 1984

Citations
- Public law: Pub. L. 98–377

Legislative history
- Introduced in the House of Representatives as H.R. 1310 by Carl D. Perkins (D–KY) on February 8, 1983; Committee consideration by House Committee on Education and Labor; House Committee on Science and Technology; Passed the House on March 2, 1983 (348–54); Passed the Senate on June 27, 1984 (voice vote) with amendment; House agreed to Senate amendment on July 25, 1984 (337–77 and 393–15); Signed into law by President Ronald Reagan on August 11, 1984

Major amendments
- National Science, Engineering, and Mathematics Authorization Act for Fiscal Year 1986; Augustus F. Hawkins-Robert T. Stafford Elementary and Secondary School Improvement Amendments of 1988; Improving America's Schools Act of 1994

The Education for Economic Security Act (Pub. L. 98–377) is a United States federal education law that was enacted in 1984. It provided funding for programs to support schools and teachers in the instruction of math and science, including grants, awards, and scholarships. The act funded teacher training programs and awarded schools and teachers that excelled in the instruction of math and science. The act also developed a program to combat asbestos in schools, fund magnet schools, and protect students from religious discrimination.

== Legislative history ==
The Reagan administration proposed legislation to address the teacher shortage by authorizing scholarships for high school math and science teachers in January 1983. A few months later, the National Commission on Excellence in Education produced its report A Nation at Risk, which indicated significant decline in the quality of education in the United States.

The bill was sponsored by Representative Carl D. Perkins on February 8, 1983. It was passed in the House of Representatives by a vote of 384-54 on March 2, 1983. The bill was passed in the Senate on June 27, 1984, incorporating the version of the bill that had been introduced by Senator Orrin Hatch. It had stalled for almost 16 months due to controversy regarding the Equal Access Act. Upon returning to the House for approval of the new version, Speaker Tip O'Neill referred the bill to committee, but Representative Perkins invoked the Calendar Wednesday rule to bring the bill to a floor vote. The House approved the Equal Access Act by 337–77 and the science and math education provisions by 393–15. After House approval on July 25, 1984, it was sent to President Ronald Reagan, and he signed it into law on August 11, 1984.

== Provisions ==
=== Title I: National Science Foundation Mathematics and Science Programs ===
Title I created programs to support math and science teachers through grants and training programs. Part A authorized the National Science Foundation (NSF) to provide grants for state governments, local governments, and institutions of higher education to fund additional education and training for teachers. Part B authorized the NSF to create programs with local governments and institutions of higher education to develop training programs and materials for teachers. Part C established the Congressional Merit Scholarships in Mathematics, Science, and Engineering Education, and it authorized the NSF to award these scholarships to exceptional college students majoring in education. Part D authorized the Director of the NSF to use funds granted by the act to create programs supporting math and science education. Part E granted the NSF additional privileges to carry out the act, guaranteed support for private school teachers, reiterated the prohibition on federal control of education, and authorized the appropriation of $104 million to be used for Title I the act in the fiscal years 1984 and 1985.

This title was rewritten to include engineering education in 1986.

=== Title II: Education for Economic Security ===
Title II provided financial assistance for teacher training and student access in math, science, computer, and foreign language education. It authorized the Secretary of Education to provide $750 million in grants to state governments in the fiscal years 1984 and 1985. It required that 70% of these grants go to elementary and secondary education programs and 30% go to higher education programs. One half of the elementary and secondary education grants was to be distributed to local governments proportionately by number of students, and the other half was to be distributed proportionately by number of students below the poverty level. Higher education grants were to be awarded competitively and used to fund teacher training programs. Additional requirements to apply for funds were also established.

=== Title III: Partnerships in Education for Mathematics, Science, and Engineering Act ===
Title III provided additional resources for math and science education through partnerships with institutions of higher education, businesses, nonprofits, local governments, mathematical and scientific organizations, museums, libraries, education television stations, and state agencies. It authorized the appropriation of $90 million to be used for grants for partners to develop education programs, award scholarships, or conduct research in the fiscal years 1984 and 1985.

=== Title IV: Presidential Awards for Teaching Excellence in Mathematics and Science ===
Title IV authorized the president to award the PAEMST to 100 math and science teachers in elementary and secondary schools. It authorized the appropriation of $1 million for the fiscal year 1985 to fund the program.

=== Title V: Asbestos School Hazard Abatement Act ===
Title V authorized the Environmental Protection Agency (EPA) to coordinate with state and local governments to address asbestos in school buildings. It established the Asbestos Hazards Abatement Program, which required the distribution of information on asbestos to state and local governments and required state governors to submit reports on asbestos in schools to the EPA. It also established the Asbestos Hazards Abatement Assistance Program, which provided financial assistance to address asbestos in schools. It authorized the appropriation of $100 million to carry out this title in fiscal years 1984 and 1985, and an additional $100 million was authorized for each fiscal year 1986-1990.

=== Title VI: Excellence in Education Act ===
Title VI authorized awards for local governments that develop successful education techniques that can be replicated. The Secretary of Education was authorized to determine the criteria for awards. Awards were limited to no more than $25,000 per fiscal year and no more than $40,000 total for each local government. It authorized the appropriation of $32 million to carry out this title in the fiscal years 1984 and 1985.

=== Title VII: Magnet Schools Assistance ===
Title VII authorized financial assistance for instruction in magnet schools to local governments that lost funding due to the repeal of the Emergency School Assistance Act in 1981 or are carrying out school desegregation. It authorized the appropriation of $225 million to carry out this title in the fiscal years 1984, 1985, and 1986. This title was intended to incentivize the integration of schools by providing higher quality classes to attract students that would otherwise remain in segregated neighborhoods. It also includes a provision that restricts the use of this title to instruct on secular humanism, but the responsibility of defining the term was delegated to local governments.

=== Title VIII: The Equal Access Act ===
Title VIII prohibited secondary schools from discriminating against students based on their beliefs in student-run organizations or forums.

=== Title IX: Star Schools Program Assistance Act ===
Title IX was added by a later amendment in 1988. It authorized the creation of partnerships with telecommunications companies to provide audiovisual facilities, equipment, and technical assistance. It was repealed by the Improving America's Schools Act of 1994 and replaced with the Star Schools Act.

== Response ==
President Reagan praised the bill for acting on the administration's desire to support to science and math education and further develop the president's award program. He also indicated his support for the bill's religious protections. He expressed reservations about the bill's cost, programs he viewed as redundant or unnecessary, and a lack of flexibility for state and local governments. Titles VII and VIII were controversial because of their relation to First Amendment issues.

== Amendments ==
In October 1984, the Human Services Reauthorization Act repealed a section of Title VII that granted the Secretary of Education the power to exempt private schools from certain provisions. Title II of the National Science, Engineering, and Mathematics Authorization Act for Fiscal Year 1986 reauthorized the act through the fiscal year 1988, and it expanded the scope of the act to include engineering education. The Asbestos Hazard Emergency Response Act of 1986 amended the Asbestos School Hazard Abatement Act to require compliance with the Toxic Substances Control Act to receive funding and reauthorized it through fiscal year 1990.

The Augustus F. Hawkins-Robert T. Stafford Elementary and Secondary School Improvement Amendments of 1988 reauthorized Title III through fiscal year 1993. It also added a ninth title to the act to establish the Star Schools Program. The Education and Training for a Competitive America Act of 1988 authorized funds for Title II in 1988 and for expansion of the partnerships of Title III to support elementary and secondary schools. It also contained the text of the Star Schools Program Assistance Act. The National Science Foundation Authorization Act of 1988 expanded Title IV to require at least 108 awards be given annually and created a similar award for foreign languages.

The Asbestos Hazard Abatement Reauthorization Act of 1990 reauthorized Title V through fiscal year 1995, modified rules for governors to track asbestos in schools, set a deadline for approval of applications for asbestos assistance, required annual reports to Congress on asbestos treatment, and modified the distribution of funding. The Improving America's Schools Act of 1994 repealed the Star Schools Program Assistance Act and replaced it with a separate Star Schools Act. The Federal Reports Elimination and Sunset Act of 1995 repealed the requirement of the NSF to produce a report on the act.

== See also ==
- Elementary and Secondary Education Act
- Higher Education Act of 1965
