= Equal Access Act =

United States federal law

- Long title: Denial of equal access prohibited
- Enacted by: the 98th United States Congress
- Effective: August 11, 1984

Citations
- Public law: 20 U.S.C. § 4071

Codification
- Titles amended: 20
- U.S.C. sections created: 4071

Legislative history
- Signed into law by President Ronald Reagan on August 11, 1984

United States Supreme Court cases
- Westside Community Board of Education v. Mergens, 496 U.S. 226 (1990)

The Equal Access Act is a United States federal law passed as Title VIII of the Education for Economic Security Act in 1984 to compel federally funded public secondary schools to provide equal access to extracurricular student clubs. Lobbied for by Christian groups seeking to guarantee students the right to conduct Bible study programs during lunch and after school. It has also been cited in litigation regarding the right of students to form gay–straight alliances; and to form groups focused on any religion or on secularism.

== Intent of the Act ==
The Act provides that if a school receives federal aid and has a "limited open forum," or at least one student-led non-curriculum club that meets outside of class time, it must allow additional such clubs to be organized, and must give them equal access to meeting spaces and school publications. Exceptions can be made for groups that "materially and substantially interfere with the orderly conduct of educational activities within the school," and a school can technically "opt out" of the act by prohibiting all non-curriculum clubs.

It was ruled constitutional by the Supreme Court in 1990 in the case Westside Community Schools v. Mergens, and the school was ordered to allow a student Christian group to meet.

At the college level, controversy arose over whether a university should pay for a publication by a religious student organization. The court ruled in Rosenberger v. Rector and Visitors of the University of Virginia that if the university pays for other student organization publications, it must also pay for religious organization publications.

The Equal Access Act has also been invoked in disputes over the formation of gay–straight alliances in high schools across the nation. Administration in high schools who have opposed the formation of gay-straight alliances, and formally denied their organizers privileges and the right to assemble faced litigation. In several cases, courts have ruled that a school must either allow the gay-straight alliance or an all non-curriculum groups from assembling on school property.

The Act requires that if a school permits any religious student group, then it must allow groups focused on any religion or on irreligion. This has been applied to stop schools from blocking Muslim, Jewish, Sikh, and other religious groups as well as Christian ones. The Secular Student Alliance and other secular groups have invoked the Act to stop public high schools from blocking students organizing secular student groups.

== Guidelines for groups and/or clubs under its protection ==
- Host school is a secondary school and receives federal financial assistance
- Already have a limited open forum, which means that at least one student-led, non-curriculum club that meets outside of class time
- Attendance is voluntary
- Group is student-initiated
- Group must guarantee aid to members who cannot afford to attend all related events and/or meetings
- Group is not disruptive
- Persons of the community that are not part of the school may not "direct, conduct, control, or regularly attend meetings"

== Guidelines for schools under its protection and/or enforcement ==
- All groups and/or clubs have equal access to meeting spaces, the PA system, school periodicals, bulletin board space, etc.
- School officials preserve and have the right to monitor meetings
- Officials preserve and have the right to require all clubs and/or groups to follow a set of guidelines
- Schools may limit meeting times and locations, only if the rules apply to all groups and/or clubs
- Schools may prohibit people from the community from attending student groups and/or clubs.
