= Alcohol-free zone =

Locations that prohibit sale of alcoholic beverages

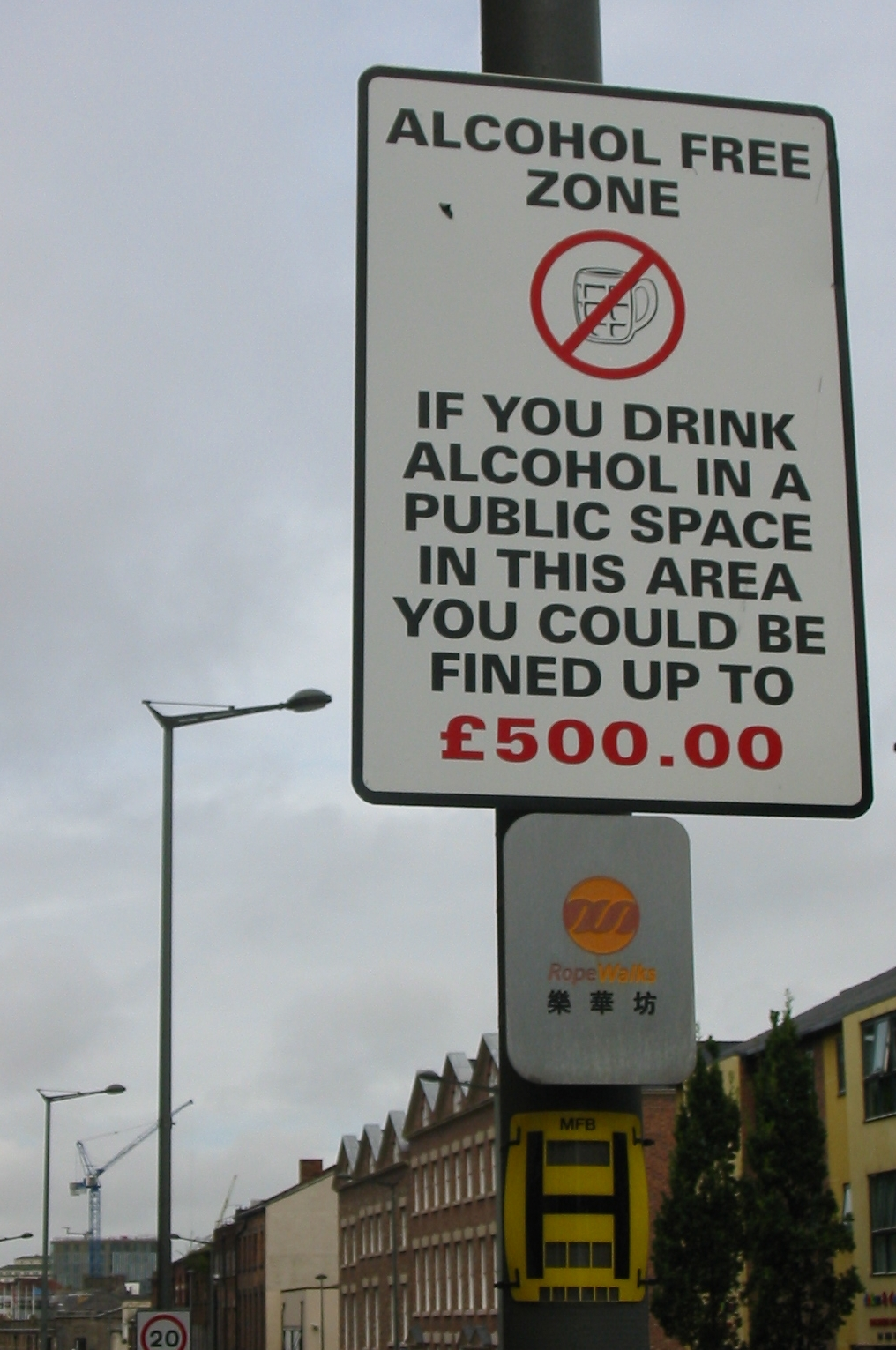
Signage for an alcohol-free zone in Liverpool, England

An alcohol-free zone, or dry zone, is a geographic area, location or establishment where the public consumption and sale of alcoholic beverages is prohibited. Alcohol-free zones have been established in some areas to address problems with drinking- and binge drinking-related crime, antisocial behavior, assaults and disorderly behavior. Alcohol-free zones have been opposed in some communities, such as in Bath, England, which has "a tradition of open-air bars and restaurants."

== Alcohol-free zones ==
=== Australia ===
In New South Wales, Australia, some streets are designated as alcohol-free zones, which is demarcated with signage stating such. Police may issue a warning to violators, and those who continue to drink can be fined and have their alcoholic beverages seized. Many parks in New South Wales are designated as alcohol-free zones. Bondi in New South Wales, Australia established an alcohol-free zone in the city in 2004 in efforts to reduce assaults and antisocial behavior influenced by street drinking.

As of April 2016, Sydney, Australia has over 60 alcohol-free zones. The City Council of Sydney proposed to eliminate the alcohol-free zones in April 2016.

=== Austria ===
- In Graz, since about 2018, it is unlawful to drink C2 (by oneself:) on Main Place (a pedestrian zone with the town hall and a grocery store), but it is allowed if you sit in the garden tables of two restaurants or if you stand at the tables of the day or night market booths.
- Vienna at Praterstern (train, public transport, street circle) similar as in Graz, Main Place.

=== Azerbaijan ===
Alcohol-free zone networks have been established in areas of Azerbaijan since at least 1996. These zones are located in areas such as cafes, tea shops and recreation centers.

=== England ===
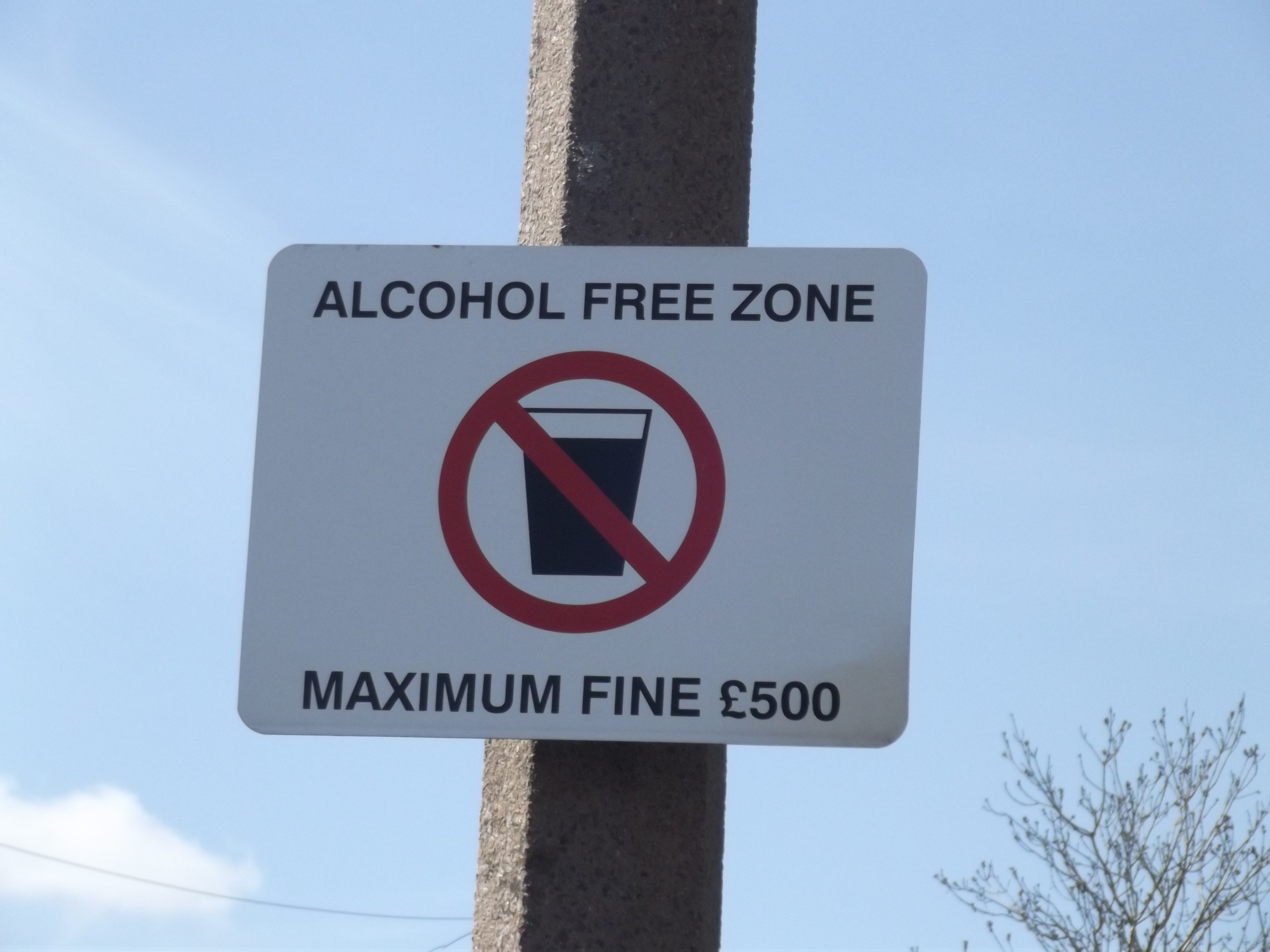
An alcohol-free zone sign at Lickey Hills, Rubery in Birmingham, England

The first alcohol-free zone established in the United Kingdom was in Coventry, England in 1988. Initially, the entire city center was declared to be an alcohol-free zone. The zone was later expanded to include the entire city.

Boston, Lincolnshire established a street drinking ban in January 2015 to address concerns with the antisocial problems associated with public alcohol consumption. The street drinking ban includes the town center and other areas. Under rules of the ban, those caught drinking in these areas can be fined £100 for a first offense. A second offense within six months after having committed a first one can be fined up to £500. Additionally, those that are requested to stop drinking and continue to do so can receive a fine of up to £500. In January 2015 to commemorate the event, various town council members and city police attended an event where cans of beer were poured down a city street drain.

In 2009, Knowsley, Merseyside established alcohol-free zones in some of its parks to address problems with binge drinking-related crime and antisocial behavior. Drinking in licensed drinking establishments was not affected by the zones.

Liverpool, England has some alcohol-free zones in areas of the city.

=== India ===
The entire region of Attappadi, Kerala, India was established as an alcohol-free zone in 1996 by Chief Minister AK Antony. Despite the ban, alcohol has been illegally brought into the region by community residents who travel to Annaikatti to purchase liquor from TASMAC stores. The state of Gujarat has been alcohol-free from decades.

=== United States ===
Some parks and recreation areas in the United States are alcohol-free zones, such as in Johnson County, Iowa, where alcohol consumption is allowed in some park and recreation areas but not others. For example, alcoholic beverages may be consumed in some day use areas and campgrounds in parks, but not in beach areas within some parks.

The riverfront at Covington, Kentucky was established as an alcohol-free zone circa 1989 by Covington police.

== See also ==
- Alcohol-free bar
- Drug-free school zone
- Legal drinking age
- Prohibition
- United States open-container laws
