= No Child Left Behind Act =

2002 United States education reform law; repealed 2015

No Child Left Behind Act of 2001
- Long title: An act to close the achievement gap with accountability, flexibility, and choice, so that no child is left behind.
- Acronyms (colloquial): NCLB
- Enacted by: the 107th United States Congress

Citations
- Public law: Pub. L. 107–110 (text) (PDF)
- Statutes at Large: 115 Stat. 1425

Codification
- Acts amended: List: Adult Education and Family Literacy Act; Age Discrimination Act of 1975; Albert Einstein Distinguished Educator Fellowship Act of 1994; Augustus F. Hawkins-Robert T. Stafford Elementary and Secondary School Improvement Amendments of 1988; Carl D. Perkins Vocational and Technical Education Act of 1998; Civil Rights Act of 1964; Communications Act of 1934; Community Services Block Grant Act; Department of Education Organization Act; District of Columbia College Access Act of 1999; Education Amendments of 1972; Education Amendments of 1978; Education Flexibility Partnership Act of 1999; Education for Economic Security Act; Educational Research, Development, Dissemination, and Improvement Act of 1994; Elementary and Secondary Education Act of 1965; Family and Medical Leave Act of 1993; General Education Provisions Act; Goals 2000: Educate America Act; Hazardous and Solid Waste Amendments of 1985; Higher Education Act of 1965; Individuals with Disabilities Education Act; James Madison Memorial Fellowship Act; Internal Revenue Code of 1986; Johnson–O'Malley Act of 1934; Legislative Branch Appropriations Act, 1997; McKinney-Vento Homeless Assistance Act of 1987; Museum and Library Services Act; National Agricultural Research, Extension, and Teaching Policy Act of 1977; National and Community Service Act of 1990; National Child Protection Act of 1993; National Education Statistics Act of 1994; National Environmental Education Act of 1990; Native American Languages Act; Public Law 88-210; Public Law 106-400; Refugee Education Assistance Act of 1980; Rehabilitation Act of 1973; Safe Drinking Water Act; School-to-Work Opportunities Act of 1994; State Dependent Care Development Grants Act; Telecommunications Act of 1996; Tribally Controlled Schools Act of 1987; Toxic Substances Control Act of 1976; Transportation Equity Act for the 21st Century; Workforce Investment Act of 1998
- Titles amended: 15 U.S.C.: Commerce and Trade; 20 U.S.C.: Education; 42 U.S.C.: Public Health and Social Welfare; 47 U.S.C.: Telegraphy
- U.S.C. sections amended: 15 U.S.C. ch. 53, subch. I §§ 2601–2629; 20 U.S.C. ch. 28 § 1001 et seq. 20 U.S.C. ch. 70; 42 U.S.C. ch. 119 § 11301 et seq. 47 U.S.C. ch. 5, subch. VI § 609; 47 U.S.C. ch. 5, subch. II § 251 et seq. 47 U.S.C. ch. 5, subch. I § 151 et seq. 47 U.S.C. ch. 5, subch. II § 271 et seq.

Legislative history
- Introduced in the House of Representatives as H.R. 1 by John Boehner (R-OH) on March 22, 2001; Committee consideration by Education and the Workforce and Judiciary; Passed the United States House of Representatives on May 23, 2001 (384–45); Passed the United States Senate on June 14, 2001 (91–8); Reported by the joint conference committee on December 13, 2001; agreed to by the United States House of Representatives on December 13, 2001 (381–41) and by the United States Senate on December 18, 2001 (87–10); Signed into law by President George W. Bush on January 8, 2002

Major amendments
- Repealed on December 10, 2015. Replaced with Every Student Succeeds Act.

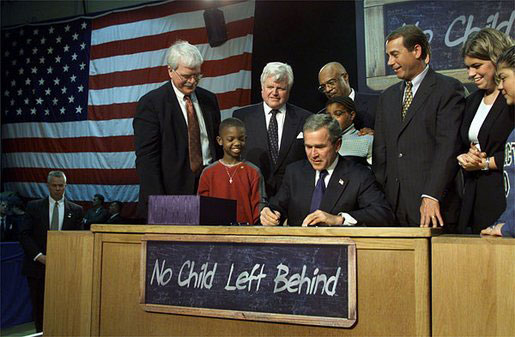
President George W. Bush signing the No Child Left Behind Act

President George W. Bush signs the No Child Left Behind Act into law.

The No Child Left Behind Act of 2001 (NCLB) was a 2002 United States act of Congress promoted by the presidential administration of George W. Bush. It reauthorized the Elementary and Secondary Education Act and included Title I provisions applying to disadvantaged students. It mandated standards-based education reform based on the premise that setting high standards and establishing measurable goals could improve individual outcomes in education. To receive school funding from the federal government, U.S. states had to create and give assessments to all students at select grade levels.

The act did not set national achievement standards. Instead, each state developed its own standards. NCLB expanded the federal role in public education through further emphasis on annual testing, annual academic progress, report cards, and teacher qualifications, as well as significant changes in funding. While the bill faced challenges from both Democratic Party and Republican Party politicians, it passed in both chambers of the U.S. Congress with significant bipartisan support.

Some of its provisions, such as restructuring schools that "failed" their students six years in a row, were controversial. After more than a decade, bipartisan criticism had increased so much that a bipartisan Congress stripped away some features of NCLB and turned the rest over to state governments in the 2015 Every Student Succeeds Act.

== Background ==
The No Child Left Behind Act was billed as a successor to the Elementary and Secondary Education Act (ESEA), which had been signed into law by President Lyndon B. Johnson in 1965. Its goal was to provide additional resources to low-income students, but following its enactment, the nation repeatedly fell short of meeting the law's goal of providing full educational opportunities to students.

Concerns regarding the U.S. education system culminated with the release in 1983 of a report entitled A Nation at Risk, written by President Ronald Reagan's National Commission on Excellence in Education. This report suggested that America's economic security would be severely compromised unless there was a major reorientation of the education system and an increase in the set of academic standards that students were expected to achieve.

Though many Republican groups historically opposed the active role of the federal government in education, lobbying efforts, public opinion, and other political developments in Washington (such as the Republican defeat in the 1996 presidential election) caused congressional Republicans to push for federal educational reforms that emphasized standardized testing and other accountability measures. At the time, increased attention was being paid to the state of education in the nation because prior to the 2000 presidential election, then-candidate George W. Bush made a number of campaign promises related to bipartisan education reform.

The increased focus in the U.S. on educational standards and accountability reflected international education policy developments and debates. After World War II, international organizations such as the United Nations Educational, Scientific and Cultural Organization (UNESCO), the World Bank, and the Organisation for Economic Co-operation and Development (OECD) devoted their attention to global educational development. From the 1960s onward, these organizations increasingly focused on learning outcomes and evaluation procedures that included the evaluation of education systems against defined standards of performance. The 2001 NCLB Act was part of this global movement toward greater accountability in education.

== Legislative history ==
President George W. Bush first proposed the use of federal aid to create a plan by which to hold schools accountable for the educational outcomes of their students on January 23, 2001; however, as it was initially described, the act faced significant criticism from interest groups such as the Education Trust because of its inclusion of vouchers. Vouchers would enable parents to choose a different school (public, private, or otherwise) for their child to attend if their district failed to meet state standards; however, critics stated that this move would take funds away from schools that needed the most funding. The NCLB Act was introduced in the U.S. House of Representatives on March 22, 2001, and it was coauthored by the representatives John Boehner, George Miller, and the senators Ted Kennedy and Judd Gregg. As it made its way through the House of Representatives and the Senate, the bill faced a number of challenges, ranging from Democratic appeals for more funding, to Republican pushback on the increased role of the federal government in the realm of education. Despite this, the Act garnered bipartisan support in both chambers of the legislature, and it was passed in the House of Representatives on December 13, 2001 (voting 381–41), and in the U.S. Senate on December 18, 2001 (voting 87–10). It was signed into law by Bush on January 8, 2002.

== Provisions of the act ==
According to the Department of Education, the No Child Left Behind Act of 2001 aimed to increase school accountability for student educational outcomes and reduce disparities between lower-performing and higher-performing students and districts. To achieve these goals, the NCLB Act required all federally funded public schools to administer a standardized test annually to students in selected grades. To improve student outcomes, the act identified several strategies school districts could employ, such as teacher professional development, educational technology, and activities to involve parents. The act also required each local agency to determine the average number of students in daily attendance in the K-12 schools it served to allocate grant money effectively for NCLB programs. Additionally, the law emphasized improving the communication of information about student achievement and school performance to parents through reporting systems designed to reflect best educational practices.

=== Title I ===
Schools that receive Title I funding through the Elementary and Secondary Education Act of 1965 must make Adequate Yearly Progress (AYP) in test scores (e.g. each year, fifth graders must do better on standardized tests than the previous year's fifth graders).

If the school's results are repeatedly poor, then steps are taken to improve the school.

- Schools that miss AYP for a second consecutive year are publicly labeled as "In Need of Improvement," and must develop a two-year improvement plan for the subject that the school is not teaching well. Students have the option to transfer to a higher performing school within the school district, if any exists.
- Missing AYP in the third year forces the school to offer free tutoring and other supplemental education services to students who are struggling.
- If a school misses its AYP target for a fourth consecutive year, the school is labelled as requiring "corrective action," which might involve wholesale replacement of staff, introduction of a new curriculum, or extending the amount of time students spend in class.
- A fifth year of failure results in planning to restructure the entire school; the plan is implemented if the school unsuccessfully hits its AYP targets for the sixth consecutive year. Common options include closing the school, turning the school into a charter school, hiring a private company to run the school, or asking the state office of education to run the school directly.

States must create AYP objectives consistent with the following requirements of the law:

1. States must develop AYP statewide measurable objectives for improved achievement by all students and for specific groups: economically disadvantaged students, students with disabilities, and students with limited English proficiency.
2. The objectives must be set with the goal of having all students at the proficient level or above within 12 years (i.e. by the end of the 2013–14 school year).
3. AYP must be primarily based on state assessments, but must also include one additional academic indicator, which is defined by the states.
4. The AYP objectives must be assessed at the school level. Schools that failed to meet their AYP objective for two consecutive years are identified for improvement.
5. School AYP results must be reported separately for each group of students identified above so that it can be determined whether each student group met the AYP objective.
6. At least 95% of each group must participate in state assessments.
7. States may aggregate up to three years of data in making AYP determinations.

The act requires states to provide "highly qualified" teachers to all students. Each state sets its own standards for what counts as "highly qualified." Similarly, the act requires states to set "one high, challenging standard" for its students. Each state decides for itself what counts as "one high, challenging standard," but the curriculum standards must be applied to all students, rather than having different standards for students in different cities or other parts of the state.

The act also requires schools to let military recruiters have students' contact information and other access to the student, if the school provides that information to universities or employers, unless the students opt out of giving military recruiters access. This portion of the law has drawn a fair amount of criticism and has even led to political resistance. For instance, in 2003 in Santa Cruz, California, student-led efforts forced school districts to create an "opt-in" policy that required students affirm they wanted the military to have their information. This successful student organizing effort was copied in various other cities throughout the United States.

The act outlines programs and requirements that have the intended purpose of preventing drug and alcohol use by students, as well as programs that would deter students from committing acts of violence in schools. The act also provides funds to states in order to enable students who have been expelled from school for certain offenses to perform acts of community service.

=== Title II – Mathematics and Science Partnerships ===
Mathematics and Science Partnerships (MSP) is education policy from Title 2, Part B, Sections 2201–2203 of the No Child Left Behind Act of 2001. The purpose of MSP is to increase student achievement in science and mathematics by partnering IHE science, math, and engineering departments with elementary and secondary science and math teachers in high-need local educational agencies (LEAs) in order to develop teachers' content knowledge and instructional performance. State education agencies may apply for competitive grants and then IHEs and LEAs may apply for a subgrant of the SEA.

== Effects on teachers, schools, and school districts ==
=== Increased accountability ===
Supporters of the NCLB claimed one of the strong positive points of the bill was the increased accountability that is required of schools and teachers. According to the legislation, schools must pass yearly tests that judge student improvement over the fiscal year. These yearly standardized tests are the main means of determining whether schools live up to required standards. If required improvements are not made, the schools face decreased funding and other punishments that contribute to the increased accountability. According to supporters, these goals were to help teachers and schools realize the significance and importance of the educational system and how it affects the nation. Opponents of this law said that the punishments only hurt the schools and do not contribute to the improvement of student education.

In addition to and in support of the above points, proponents claimed that No Child Left Behind:

- Linked state academic content standards with student outcomes
- Measured student performance: a student's progress in reading and math was mandated to be measured annually in grades 3 through 8 and at least once during high school via standardized tests
- Provided information for parents by requiring states and school districts to give parents detailed report cards on schools and districts explaining the school's AYP performance; schools must inform parents when their child is taught by a teacher or para-professional who does not meet "highly qualified" requirements
- Established the foundation for schools and school districts to significantly enhance parental involvement and improved administration through the use of the assessment data to drive decisions on instruction, curriculum and business practices

The Commonwealth of Pennsylvania proposed tying teacher's salaries to test scores. If a district's students do poorly, the state cuts the district's budget the following year and the teachers get a pay cut. Critics pointed out that if a school does poorly, reducing its budget and cutting teacher salaries will likely hamper the school's ability to improve.

=== School choice ===
- Gave options to students enrolled in schools failing to meet AYP. If a school failed to meet AYP targets two or more years running, the school was mandated to offer eligible children the chance to transfer to higher-performing local schools, receive free tutoring, or attend after-school programs.
- Gave school districts the opportunity to demonstrate proficiency, even for subgroups that do not meet State Minimum Achievement standards, through a process called "safe harbor," a precursor to growth-based or value-added assessments.

=== Narrow definition of research ===
The act required schools to rely on scientifically based research for programs and teaching methods. The act defined this as "research that involves the application of rigorous, systematic, and objective procedures to obtain reliable and valid knowledge relevant to education activities and programs." It further stated that scientifically based research results in replicable and applicable findings from research that used appropriate methods to generate persuasive, empirical conclusions.

=== Quality and distribution of teachers ===
Before the NCLB act, new teachers were typically required to have a bachelor's degree, be fully certified, and demonstrate subject matter knowledge—generally through tests. Under NCLB, existing teachers—including those with tenure—were also supposed to meet standards. They could meet the same requirements set for new teachers or could meet a state-determined "...high, objective, uniform state standard of evaluation," aka HOUSSE. Downfall of the quality requirements of the NCLB legislation have received little research attention, in part because state rules require few changes from pre-existing practice. There is also little evidence that the rules have altered trends in observable teacher traits. American educators have been struggling to identify which teacher traits are important contributors to student achievement. Currently, there is no consensus on what traits are most important and most education policy experts agree that further research is required.

== Effects on student assessment ==
Several of the analyses of state accountability systems that were in place before NCLB indicate that outcomes accountability led to faster growth in achievement for the states that introduced such systems. The direct analysis of state test scores before and after enactment of NCLB also supports its positive impact. A primary criticism asserts that NCLB reduces effective instruction and student learning by causing states to lower achievement goals and motivate teachers to "teach to the test." A primary supportive claim asserts that systematic testing provides data that shed light on which schools do not teach basic skills effectively, so that interventions can be made to improve outcomes for all students while reducing the achievement gap for disadvantaged and disabled students.

== Improved test scores ==
In 2006 the U.S. Department of Education pointed to the National Assessment of Educational Progress (NAEP) results, released in July 2005, showing improved student achievement in reading and math:

- More progress was made by nine-year-olds in reading in the last five years than in the previous 28 years combined.
- America's nine-year-olds age group, posted the best scores in reading (since 1971) and math (since 1973) in the history of the report. America's 13-year-olds earned the highest math scores the test ever recorded.
- Reading and math scores for black and Hispanic nine-year-olds reached an all-time high.
- Achievement gaps in reading and math between white and black nine-year-olds and between white and Hispanic nine-year-olds are at an all-time low.
- Forty-three states and the District of Columbia either improved academically or held steady in all categories (fourth- and eighth-grade reading and fourth- and eighth-grade math).

These statistics compare 2005 with 2000, though No Child Left Behind did not take effect until 2003. Critics pointed out that the increase in scores between 2000 and 2003 was roughly the same as the increase between 2003 and 2005, which calls into question how any increase can be attributed to No Child Left Behind. They also argue that some of the subgroups are cherry-picked—that in other subgroups scores remained the same or fell. Also, the makers of the standardized tests have been blamed for making the tests easier so that it is easier for schools to sufficiently improve.

Education researchers Thomas Dee and Brian Jacob argue that NCLB showed statistically significant positive impact on students' performance on 4th-grade math exams (equal to two-thirds of a year's worth of growth), smaller and statistically insignificant improvements in 8th-grade math exam performance, and no discernible improvement in reading performance.

=== Criticisms of standardized testing ===
Critics argued that the focus on standardized testing (all students in a state take the same test under the same conditions) encourages teachers to teach a narrow subset of skills that the school believes increases test performance, rather than achieve in-depth understanding of the overall curriculum. For example, a teacher who knows that all questions on a math test are simple addition problems (e.g., What is 2 + 3?) might not invest any class time on the practical applications of addition, to leave more time for the material the test assesses. This is colloquially referred to as "teaching to the test." "Teaching to the test" has been observed to raise test scores, though not as much as other teaching techniques.

Many teachers who practice "teaching to the test" misinterpret the educational outcomes the tests are designed to measure. On two state tests, New York and Michigan, and the National Assessment of Educational Progress (NAEP) almost two-thirds of eighth graders missed math word problems that required an application of the Pythagorean theorem to calculate the distance between two points. The teachers correctly anticipated the content of the tests, but incorrectly assumed each test would present simplistic items rather than higher-order items.

Another problem is that outside influences often affect student performance. Students who struggle to take tests may perform well using another method of learning such as project-based learning. Sometimes, factors such as home life can affect test performance. Basing performance on one test inaccurately measures student success overall. Critics stated that No Child Left Behind failed to account for all these factors.

Those opposed to the use of testing to determine educational achievement prefer alternatives such as subjective teacher opinions, classwork, and performance-based assessments.

Under No Child Left Behind, schools and teachers were held almost exclusively accountable for levels of student performance. This meant that schools that were greatly improving were still labeled as "failing" because the students had not yet made it to a "proficient" level of achievement. Since 2005, the U.S. Department of Education has approved 15 states to implement growth model pilots. Each state adopted one of four distinct growth models: Trajectory, Transition Tables, Student Growth Percentiles, and Projection.

The incentives for improvement also may cause states to lower their official standards. Because each state can produce its own standardized tests, a state can make its statewide tests easier to increase scores. Missouri, for example, improved testing scores but openly admitted that they lowered the standards. A 2007 study by the U.S. Department of Education indicates that the observed differences in states' reported scores is largely due to differences in the stringency of their standards.

== Intended effects on curriculum and standards ==
=== Improvement over local standards ===
Many argued that local government had failed students, necessitating federal intervention to remedy issues like teachers teaching outside their areas of expertise, and complacency in the face of continually failing schools. Some local governments, notably that of New York state, supported NCLB provisions because local standards failed to provide adequate oversight over special education while NCLB would let them use longitudinal data more effectively to monitor Adequate Yearly Progress (AYP).

=== Quality of education ===
NCLB was intended to:

- Increase the quality of education by requiring schools to improve their performance
- Improve quality of instruction by requiring schools to implement "scientifically based research" practices in the classroom, parent involvement programs, and professional development activities for those students that are not encouraged or expected to attend college.
- Support early literacy through the Early Reading First initiative.
- Emphasize reading, language arts, mathematics and science achievement as "core academic subjects."

Student performance in other subjects (besides reading and math) was to be measured as a part of overall progress.

=== Effect on arts and electives ===
NCLB's main focus was on skills in reading, writing, and mathematics, which are areas related to economic success. Combined with the budget crises in the late-2000s recession, some schools cut or eliminated classes and resources for many subject areas that are not part of NCLB's accountability standards. From 2007 to 2010, almost 71% of schools reduced instruction time in subjects such as history, arts, language, and music to provide more time and resources to mathematics and English.

In some schools, the classes remained available, but individual students who were not proficient in basic skills were sent to remedial reading or mathematics classes rather than arts, sports, or other electives.

According to Paul Reville, the author of "Stop Narrowing of the Curriculum By 'Right-Sizing' School Time," teachers learned that it would take far more time to ensure that each and every student was proficient in the "gateway" subjects.

Physical education was one of the subjects least affected. Like many electives and non-core classes, No Child Left Behind did not address Physical Education, but during the same period the federal government was trying to reverse the obesity crisis in the United States through programs like First Lady Michelle Obama's Let's Move Campaign, which sought to improve the quantity and quality of physical education.

No Child Left Behind posed opportunities, challenges, and risks for science education in elementary and middle schools; worldwide competition insists on rapidly improving science education. A 2006 study claimed that adding science assessments to the NCLB requirements may result in science being taught in more elementary schools and by more teachers than ever before. Two-thirds of elementary school teachers indicated that they were not familiar with national science standards. Most concern circulated around the result that consuming too much time for language arts and mathematics may limit children's experience—and thus interest—in sciences.

== Effects on school and students ==
=== Gifted students ===
NCLB pressured schools to guarantee that nearly all students meet the minimum skill levels (set by each state) in reading, writing, and arithmetic—but required nothing beyond these minima. It provided no incentives to improve student achievement beyond the bare minimum. Programs not essential for achieving mandated minimum skills were neglected or canceled by those districts.

In particular, NCLB did not require any programs for gifted, talented, and other high-performing students. Federal funding of gifted education decreased by a third over the law's first five years. There was only one program that helped improve the gifted: they received $9.6 million. In the 2007 budget, President George W. Bush zeroed this out. While NCLB did not address the education of academically gifted students, some states (such as Arizona, California, Virginia, and Pennsylvania) required schools to identify gifted students and provide them with an appropriate education, including grade advancement. In other states, such as Michigan, state funding for gifted and talented programs was cut by up to 90% in the year after the Act became law.

A 2008 study by the Fordham Institute suggested that the lack of incentive for schools to meet the needs of high achieving students had serious consequences: while between 2000 and 2007 students in the lowest 10th percentile (low performers) had improved their average performance on the 4th grade reading portion of the National Assessment of Educational Progress by 16 points, the scores of the highest-performing students (90th percentile and above) hardly budged.

=== Unrealistic goals ===
"There's a fallacy in the law and everybody knows it," said Alabama State Superintendent Joe Morton in August 2010. According to the No Child Left Behind Act, every child was supposed to test on grade level in reading and math by 2014. "That can't happen," said Morton. "You have too many variables and you have too many scenarios, and everybody knows that would never happen." Alabama State Board Member Mary Jane Caylor said, "I don't think that No Child Left Behind has benefited this state." She argued the goal of 100% proficiency is unattainable.

=== Gaming the system ===
The system of incentives and penalties set up a strong motivation for schools, districts, and states to manipulate test results. For example, schools were shown to employ "creative reclassification" of high school dropouts (to reduce unfavorable statistics). For example, at Sharpstown High School in Houston, Texas, more than 1,000 students began high school as freshmen, and four years later, fewer than 300 students were enrolled in the senior class. However, none of these "missing" students from Sharpstown High were reported as dropouts.

=== Variability in student potential and 100% compliance ===
The act was promoted as requiring 100% of students (including disadvantaged and special education students) within a school to reach the same state standards in reading and mathematics by 2014; detractors charge that a 100% goal is unattainable, and critics of the NCLB requirement for "one high, challenging standard" claimed that some students were simply unable to perform at the given level for their age, no matter how effective the teacher is. While statewide standards reduced the educational inequality between privileged and underprivileged districts in a state, they still imposed a "one size fits all" standard on individual students. Particularly in states with high standards, schools could be punished for not being able to dramatically raise the achievement of students that may have below-average capabilities.

The term "all" in NCLB ended up meaning less than 100% of students, because by the time the 100% requirement was to take effect in 2015, no state had reached the goal of having 100% of students pass the proficiency bar.

Simply being classified as having special education needs did not automatically exempt students from assessment. Most students with mild disabilities or physical disabilities took the same test as non-disabled students. Students who had an Individual Education Plan (IEP) and who were assessed had to receive the accommodations specified in the IEP during assessment; if these accommodations did not change the nature of the assessment, then these students' scores were counted the same as any other student's score. Common acceptable changes included extended test time, testing in a quieter room or one-on-one with a proctor, translation of math problems into the student's native language, receiving large print, or allowing a student to type answers (often on a plain-text editor on a locked-down computer without spell-check, dictionaries, and access to the internet) instead of writing them by hand.

In addition to not requiring 5% of students to be assessed at all, regulations let schools use alternate assessments to declare up to 1% of all students proficient for the purposes of the Act. States were given broad discretion in selecting alternate assessments. For example, a school could accept an Advanced Placement test for English in lieu of the English test written by the state and simplified tests for students with significant cognitive disabilities. The Virginia Alternate Assessment Program (VAAP) and Virginia Grade Level Alternative (VGLA) options, for example, were considered portfolio assessments.

Organizations that supported NCLB assessment of disabled or limited English proficient (LEP) students said that inclusion ensures that deficiencies in the education of these disadvantaged students were identified and addressed. Opponents said that testing students with disabilities violates the Individuals with Disabilities Education Act (IDEA) by making students with disabilities learn the same material as non-disabled students.

=== Children with disabilities ===
NCLB included incentives to reward schools showing progress for students with disabilities and other measures to fix or provide students with alternative options than schools not meeting the needs of the disabled population. The law was written so that the scores of students with IEPs (Individualized Education Plans) and 504 plans were counted just as other students' scores are counted. Some schools argued against having disabled populations involved in their AYP measurements because they claim that there are too many variables involved.

=== Aligning the Individuals with Disabilities Education Act ===
Stemming from the Education for All Handicapped Children Act (EAHCA) of 1975, the Individuals with Disabilities Education Act (IDEA) was enacted in its first form in 1991, and then reenacted with new education aspects in 2006 (although still referred to as IDEA 2004). It kept the EAHCA requirements of free and accessible education for all children. The 2004 IDEA authorized formula gives discretionary grants to states for research, technology, and training. It also required schools to use research-based interventions to assist students with disabilities.

The amount of funding each school would receive from its "Local Education Agency" for each year would be divided by the number of children with disabilities and multiplied by the number of students with disabilities participating in the schoolwide programs.

Particularly since 2004, policymakers sought to align IDEA with NCLB. The most obvious points of alignment include the shared requirements for Highly Qualified Teachers, for establishment of goals for students with special needs, and for assessment levels for these students. In 2004, President Bush signed provisions that would define for both of these acts what was considered a "highly qualified teacher."

=== Positive effects for students with disabilities ===
The National Council on Disability (NCD) looked at how NCLB and IDEA are improving outcomes for students with Down syndrome. The effects they investigated included reducing the number of students who drop out, increasing graduation rates, and effective strategies to transition students to post-secondary education. Their studies have reported that NCLB and IDEA changed the attitudes and expectations for students with disabilities. They were pleased that students were finally included in state assessment and accountability systems. NCLB made assessments be taken "seriously," they found, as assessments and accommodations were then under review by administrators.

Another organization that found positive correlations between NCLB and IDEA was the National Center on Educational Outcomes. It published a brochure for parents of students with disabilities about how the two (NCLB & IDEA) work well together because they "provide both individualized instruction and school accountability for students and disabilities." They specifically highlighted the new focus on "shared responsibility of general and special education teachers," forcing schools to have disabled students more on their radar." They did acknowledge that for each student to "participate in the general curriculum [of high standards for all students] and make progress toward proficiency," additional time and effort for coordination were needed. The National Center on Educational Outcomes reported that disabled students would now receive "...the academic attention and resources they deserved."

Research was done on how the laws would impact students who are deaf or hard of hearing. First, the legislation makes schools responsible for how students with disabilities score, emphasizing "...student outcomes instead of placement." It also puts the public eye on how outside programs can be utilized to improve outcomes for this underserved population, and has thus prompted more research on the effectiveness of certain in- and out-of-school interventions. For example, NCLB requirements made researchers study the effects of read aloud or interpreters on both reading and mathematics assessments, and on having students sign responses that are then recorded by a scribe.

Still, research thus far on the positive effects of NCLB/IDEA is limited. It has been aimed at young students in an attempt to find strategies to help them learn to read. Evaluations also have included a limited number of students, which make it very difficult to draw conclusions to a broader group. Evaluations also focus only on one type of disabilities.

=== Negative effects for students with disabilities ===
The National Council for Disabilities had reservations about how the regulations of NCLB fit with those of IDEA. One concern was how schools could effectively intervene and develop strategies when NCLB calls for group accountability rather than individual student attention. The "individual" nature of IDEA is "inconsistent with the group nature of NCLB." They worried that NCLB focused too much on standardized testing and not enough on the work-based experience necessary for obtaining jobs in the future. Also, NCLB was measured essentially by a single test score, while IDEA calls for various measures of student success.

IDEA's focus on various measures stems from its foundation in Individualized Education Plans for students with disabilities (IEP). An IEP is designed to give students with disabilities individual goals that are often not on their grade level. An IEP is intended for "developing goals and objectives that correspond to the needs of the student, and ultimately choosing a placement in the least restrictive environment possible for the student." Under the IEP, students could be able to legally have lowered success criteria for academic success.

A 2006 report by the Center for Evaluation and Education Policy (CEEP) and the Indiana Institute on Disability and Community indicated that most states were not making AYP because of special education subgroups even though progress had been made toward that end. This was in effect pushing schools to cancel the inclusion model and keep special education students separate. "IDEA calls for individualized curriculum and assessments that determine success based on growth and improvement each year. NCLB, in contrast, measured all students by the same markers, which are based not on individual improvement but by proficiency in math and reading," the study states. When interviewed with the Indiana University Newsroom, author of the CEEP report Sandi Cole said, "The system needs to make sense. Don't we want to know how much a child is progressing towards the standards? ... We need a system that values learning and growth over time, in addition to helping students reach high standards." Cole found in her survey that NCLB encouraged teachers to teach to the test, limiting curriculum choices/options, and to use the special education students as a "scapegoat" for their school not making AYP. In addition, Indiana administrators who responded to the survey indicated that NCLB testing led to higher numbers of students with disabilities dropping out of school.

Legal journals also commented on the incompatibility of IDEA and NCLB; some said the acts may never be reconciled with one another. They point out that an IEP is designed specifically for individual student achievement, which gives the rights to parents to ensure that the schools are following the necessary protocols of Free Appropriate Public Education (FAPE). They worry that not enough emphasis is being placed on the child's IEP with this setup. In Board of Education for Ottawa Township High School District 140 v. Spelling, two Illinois school districts and parents of disabled students challenged the legality of NCLB's testing requirements in light of IDEA's mandate to provide students with individualized education. Although students there were aligned with "proficiency" to state standards, students did not meet requirements of their IEP. Their parents feared that students were not given right to FAPE. The case questioned which better indicated progress: standardized test measures, or IEP measures? It concluded that since some students may never test on grade level, all students with disabilities should be given more options and accommodations with standardized testing than they currently receive.

== Effects on racial and ethnic minority students ==
=== Attention to minority populations ===
- The Act sought to narrow the class and racial achievement gap in the United States by creating common expectations for all. NCLB showed mixed success in eliminating the racial achievement gap. Although there was some evidence to support that test scores were improving, studies did not find evidence that racial achievement gaps had narrowed in a significant way since the legislation was enacted.
- NCLB required schools and districts to focus their attention on the academic achievement of traditionally under-served groups of children, such as low-income students, students with disabilities, and students of "major racial and ethnic subgroups". Each state was responsible for defining major racial and ethnic subgroups itself. Many previous state-created systems of accountability measured only average school performance, so schools could be highly rated even if they had large achievement gaps between affluent and disadvantaged students.

=== State refusal to produce non-English assessments ===
Under NCLB, state were permitted to give students learning English as a second language assessments in their native language for up to three years (or five years, on a case by case basis), after which they were required to take an English-language assessment. As of 2006, only 10 states chose to test any English language learners in their native language; the vast majority of English language learners were given English language assessments.

Many schools tested or assessed students with limited English proficiency even when the students were exempt from NCLB-mandated reporting, because the tests could provide useful information to the teacher and school. In certain schools with large immigrant populations, this exemption comprised a majority of young students.

NCLB testing under-reported learning at non-English-language immersion schools, particularly those that immerse students in Native American languages. NCLB required some Native American students to take standardized tests in English. In other cases, the students could be legally tested in their native language, except when the state did not pay to have the test translated.

=== Demographic study of AYP failure rates and requirement for failing schools ===
One 2006 study found that schools in California and Illinois that had not met Adequate Yearly Progress (AYP) serve 75–85% minority students while schools meeting AYP have less than 40% minority students. Schools that did not meet AYP were required to offer their students' parents the opportunity to transfer their students to a non-failing school within the district, but it was not required that the other school accept the student. NCLB controlled the portion of federal Title I funding based upon each school meeting annual set standards. Any participating school that did not make AYP for two years was required to offer parents the choice to send their child to a non-failing school in the district, and after three years to provide supplemental services such as free tutoring or after-school assistance. After five years of not meeting AYP, the school was to make dramatic changes to how the school is run, which could entail state-takeover.

== Funding ==
As part of their support for NCLB, the Bush administration and Congress backed massive increases in funding for elementary and secondary education. Total federal education funding increased from $42.2 billion in 2001 (the fiscal year before the law's passage) up to $55.7 billion in 2004. A new $1 billion Reading First program was created, distributing funds to local schools to improve the teaching of reading, and over $100 million for its companion, Early Reading First. Numerous other formula programs received large increases as well. This was consistent with the administration's position of funding formula programs, which distribute money to local schools for their use, and grant programs, where particular schools or groups apply directly to the federal government for funding. In total, federal funding for education increased 59.8% from 2000 to 2003.

The act created a new competitive-grant program called Reading First, funded at $1.02 billion in 2004, to help states and districts set up "scientific, research-based" reading programs for children in grades K–3 (with priority given to high-poverty areas). A smaller early-reading program sought to help states better prepare 3- to 5-year-olds in disadvantaged areas to read. The program's funding was later cut drastically by Congress amid budget talks.

Through an alteration in the Title I funding formula, the No Child Left Behind Act was expected to better target resources to school districts with high concentrations of poor children. The law also included provisions intended to give states and districts greater flexibility in how they spent a portion of their federal allotments.

Funding for school technology used in classrooms as part of NCLB was administered by the Enhancing Education Through Technology Program (EETT). Funding sources were used for equipment, professional development and training for educators, and updated research. The EETT program formulaically distributed funds to states, which then allocated half to local districts by Title I formula and half competitively. Districts were required to spend at least 25% of EETT funds on professional development, but most exceeded this, investing over $159 million in teacher training during the 2004–05 school year. Despite having broad discretion in fund use, surveys showed that EETT dollars were targeted by districts towards improving student achievement in reading and mathematics, engaging in data-driven decision making, and launching online assessment programs.

In addition, the provisions of NCLB permitted increased flexibility for state and local agencies in the use of federal education money.

The NCLB increases were companions to another massive increase in federal education funding at that time. The Bush administration and Congress passed very large increases in funding for the Individuals with Disabilities Education Act (IDEA) at the same time as the NCLB increases. IDEA Part B, a state formula-funding program that distributes money to local districts for the education of students with disabilities, was increased from $6.3 billion in 2001 to $10.1 billion in 2004. Because a district's and state's performance on NCLB measures depended on improved performance by students with disabilities, particularly, students with learning disabilities, this 60% increase in funding was also an important part of the overall approach to NCLB implementation.

=== Criticisms of funding levels ===
Some critics claimed that extra expenses are not fully reimbursed by increased levels of federal NCLB funding. Others noted that funding for the law increased massively following passage and that billions in funds previously allocated to particular uses could be reallocated to new uses. Even before the law's passage, Secretary of Education Rod Paige noted ensuring that children are educated remained a state responsibility regardless of federal support:

Washington is willing to help [with the additional costs of federal requirements], as we've helped before, even before we [proposed NCLB]. But this is a part of the teaching responsibility that each state has. ... Washington has offered some assistance now. In the legislation, we have ... some support to pay for the development of tests. But even if that should be looked at as a gift, it is the state responsibility to do this.

Various early Democratic supporters of NCLB criticized its implementation, claiming it was not adequately funded by either the federal government or the states. Ted Kennedy, the legislation's initial sponsor, once stated: "The tragedy is that these long overdue reforms are finally in place, but the funds are not." Susan B. Neuman, U.S. Department of Education's former Assistant Secretary for Elementary and Secondary Education, commented about her worries of NCLB in a meeting of the International Reading Association:

In [the most disadvantaged schools] in America, even the most earnest teacher has often given up because they lack every available resource that could possibly make a difference. ... When we say all children can achieve and then not give them the additional resources ... we are creating a fantasy.

Organizations particularly criticized the unwillingness of the federal government to "fully fund" the act. Though appropriations bills always originate in the House of Representatives, during the Bush Administration, neither the Senate nor the White House requested federal funding up to the authorized levels for several of the act's main provisions. For example, Bush requested only $13.3 billion of a possible $22.75 billion in 2006. Advocacy groups noted that President Bush's 2008 budget proposal allotted $61 billion for the Education Department, cutting funding by $1.3 billion from the year before. 44 out of 50 states would have received reductions in federal funding if the budget passed as it was. Specifically, funding for the Enhancing Education Through Technology Program (EETT) continued to drop while the demand for technology in schools has increased. However, these claims focused on reallocated funds, as each of Bush's proposed budgets increased funding for major NCLB formula programs such as Title I, including his final 2009 budget proposal.

Members of Congress viewed these authorized levels as spending caps, not spending promises. Some opponents argued that these funding shortfalls mean that schools faced with the system of escalating penalties for failing to meet testing targets were denied the resources necessary to remedy problems detected by testing. However, federal NCLB formula funding increased by billions during this period and state and local funding increased by over $100 billion from school year 2001–02 through 2006–07.

In fiscal year 2007, $75 billion in costs were shifted from NCLB, adding further stresses on state budgets. This decrease resulted in schools cutting programs that served to educate children, which subsequently impacted the ability to meet the goals of NCLB. The decrease in funding came at a time when there was an increase in expectations for school performance. To make ends meet, many schools re-allocated funds that had been intended for other purposes (e.g., arts, sports, etc.) to achieve the national educational goals set by NCLB. Congress acknowledged these funding decreases and retroactively provided the funds to cover shortfalls, but without the guarantee of permanent aid. Under a 2007 Bush administration proposal, Title I funding directly to districts for disadvantaged students and schools was to remain at the same level as 2006 despite increasing numbers of schools identified for improvement, though $200 million in new Title I funds were to be distributed to states.

=== State education budgets ===
According to the book NCLB Meets School Realities, the act was put into action during a time of fiscal crisis for most states. While states were being forced to make budget cuts, including in the area of education, they had to incur additional expenses to comply with the requirements of the NCLB Act. The funding they received from the federal government in support of NCLB was not enough to cover the added expense necessary to adhere to the new law.

== Proposals for reform ==
The Joint Organizational Statement on No Child Left Behind was a proposal by more than 135 national civil rights, education, disability advocacy, civic, labor, and religious groups that signed a statement calling for major changes to the federal education law. The National Center for Fair & Open Testing (FairTest) initiated and chaired the meetings that produced the statement, originally released in October 2004. The statement's central message was that "the law's emphasis needs to shift from applying sanctions for failing to raise test scores to holding states and localities accountable for making the systemic changes that improve student achievement." The number of organizations signing the statement nearly quadrupled since it was launched in late 2004. The goal was to influence Congress, and the broader public, as the law's scheduled reauthorization approached.

Education critic Alfie Kohn argued that the NCLB law was "unredeemable" and should be scrapped. He stated that NCLB's "main effect has been to sentence poor children to an endless regimen of test-preparation drills".

In February 2007, former Health and Human Services Secretary Tommy Thompson and Georgia Governor Roy Barnes, Co-Chairs of the Aspen Commission on No Child Left Behind, announced the release of the Commission's final recommendations for the reauthorization of the No Child Left Behind Act. The Commission was an independent, bipartisan effort to improve NCLB and ensure it was a more useful force in closing the achievement gap that separates disadvantaged children and their peers. After a year of hearings, analysis, and research, the Commission uncovered the successes of NCLB, as well as provisions that must be significantly changed.

The Commission's goals were:

- Have effective teachers for all students, effective principals for all communities
- Accelerate progress and achievement gaps closed through improved accountability
- Move beyond status quo to effective school improvement and student options
- Have fair and accurate assessments of student progress
- Have high standards for every student in every state
- Ensure high schools prepare students for college and the workplace
- Drive progress through reliable, accurate data
- Encourage parental involvement and empowerment

The Forum on Educational Accountability (FEA), a working group of signers of the Joint Organizational Statement on NCLB, offered an alternative proposal. It proposed to shift NCLB from applying sanctions for failing to raise test scores to supporting state and communities and holding them accountable as they make systemic changes that improve student learning.

== 2010 Obama administration reforms ==
President Barack Obama released a blueprint for reform of the Elementary and Secondary Education Act, the successor to No Child Left Behind, in March 2010. Specific revisions included providing funds for states to implement a broader range of assessments to evaluate advanced academic skills, including students' abilities to conduct research, use technology, engage in scientific investigation, solve problems, and communicate effectively.

In addition, Obama proposed that the NCLB legislation lessen its stringent accountability punishments to states by focusing more on student improvement. Improvement measures would encompass assessing all children appropriately, including English language learners, minorities, and special needs students. The school system would be re-designed to consider measures beyond reading and math tests; and would promote incentives to keep students enrolled in school through graduation, rather than encouraging student drop-out to increase AYP scores.

Obama's objectives also entailed lowering the achievement gap between Black and White students and also increasing the federal budget by $3 billion to help schools meet the strict mandates of the bill. There was also a proposal put forward by the Obama administration that states increase their academic standards after a dumbing down period, focus on re-classifying schools that have been labeled as failing, and develop a new evaluation process for teachers and educators.

The federal government's gradual investment in public social provisions provided the NCLB Act a forum to deliver on its promise to improve achievement for all of its students. Education critics argued that though the legislation is marked as an improvement to the ESEA in de-segregating the quality of education in schools, it is actually harmful. The legislation became virtually the only federal social policy meant to address wide-scale social inequities, and its policy features inevitably stigmatized both schools attended by children of the poor and children in general.

Moreover, critics further argued that the then-current political landscape of this country, which favored market-based solutions to social and economic problems, eroded trust in public institutions and undermined political support for an expansive concept of social responsibility, which subsequently resulted in a disinvestment in the education of the poor and privatization of American schools.

Skeptics posited that NCLB provides distinct political advantages to Democrats, whose focus on accountability offers a way for them to speak of equal opportunity and avoid being classified as the party of big government, special interests, and minority groups—a common accusation from Republicans who wanted to discredit what they see as the traditional Democratic agenda. Opponents posited that NCLB inadvertently shifted the debate on education and racial inequality to traditional political alliances. Consequently, major political discord remained between those who opposed federal oversight of state and local practices and those who viewed NCLB in terms of civil rights and educational equality.

In the plan, the Obama Administration responded to critiques that standardized testing fails to capture higher level thinking by outlining new systems of evaluation to capture more in depth assessments on student achievement. His plan came on the heels of the announcement of the Race to the Top initiative, a $4.35 billion reform program financed by the Department of Education through the American Recovery and Reinvestment Act of 2009.

The Obama administration said that accurate assessments "...can be used to accurately measure student growth; to better measure how states, districts, schools, principals, and teachers are educating students; to help teachers adjust and focus their teaching, and to provide better information to students and their families." The administration pledged to support state governments in their efforts to improve standardized test provisions by upgrading the standards they are set to measure. To do this, the federal government was to give states grants to help develop and implement assessments based on higher standards so they can more accurately measure school progress. This mirrors provisions in the Race to the Top program that required states to measure individual achievement through sophisticated data collection from kindergarten to higher education.

While the Obama administration planned to improve the quality of standardized testing, it did not plan to eliminate the testing requirements and accountability measures produced by standardized tests. Rather, they intended to provide additional resources and flexibility to meet new goals. Critics of Obama's reform efforts maintained that high-stakes testing is detrimental to school success across the country because it encourages teachers to "teach to the test" and places undue pressure on teachers and schools if they fail to meet benchmarks.

The re-authorization process became somewhat controversial as lawmakers and politicians debated about the changes that must be made to the bill to make it work best for the educational system.

In 2012, President Barack Obama granted waivers from NCLB requirements to several states. "In exchange for that flexibility, those states 'have agreed to raise standards, improve accountability, and undertake essential reforms to improve teacher effectiveness,' the White House said in a statement."

== Replacement ==
On April 30, 2015, a bill was introduced to Congress to replace the No Child Left Behind Act, the Every Student Succeeds Act, which was passed by the House on December 2 and the Senate on December 9, before being signed into law by President Obama on December 10, 2015. This bill affords states more flexibility in regards to setting their own respective standards for measuring school as well as student performance. While the No Child Left Behind Act mandated labels for lower performing schools, the ESSA allows for no labels to be put on the lowest performing schools. A school's success is also determined by 4- and 5-year graduation rates rather than the previous 4-year determination. This further enables flexibility in standards of student performance.

== See also ==
- Social policy and Education policy
- Annenberg Foundation a major supporter
- Campbell's law, argues focus on tests can impair educational outcome
- Compensatory education
- FairTest
- The Bell Curve
- Mental health provisions in Title V of the No Child Left Behind Act of 2001
- Ohio Graduation Test
- Prairie State Achievement Examination
- Race to the Top
- School Improvement Grant
- Soft bigotry of low expectations
- Standards-based education
