= Title 20 of the United States Code =

U.S. federal statutes on education

Title 20 of the United States Code outlines the role of education in the United States Code.

- 20 U.S.C. ch. 1— Office of Education
- 20 U.S.C. ch. 2—Teaching of Agricultural, Trade, Home Economics, and Industrial Subjects
- 20 U.S.C. ch. 3—Smithsonian Institution, National Museums and Art Galleries
- 20 U.S.C. ch. 4—National Zoological Park
- 20 U.S.C. ch. 5—Government Collections and Institutions for Research, and Material for Educational Institutions
- 20 U.S.C. ch. 6—American Printing House for the Blind
- 20 U.S.C. ch. 6A—Vending Facilities for Blind in Federal Buildings
- 20 U.S.C. ch. 7—Instruction as to Nature and Effect of Alcoholic Drinks and Narcotics
- 20 U.S.C. ch. 8—Howard University
- 20 U.S.C. ch. 9—National Training School for Boys
- 20 U.S.C. ch. 10—National Training School for Girls
- 20 U.S.C. ch. 11—National Arboretum
- 20 U.S.C. ch. 12—Foreign and Exchange Students
- 20 U.S.C. ch. 13—Financial Assistance to Local Educational Agencies
- 20 U.S.C. ch. 14—School Construction in Areas Affected by Federal Activities
- 20 U.S.C. ch. 15—Studies and Research On Problems in Education
- 20 U.S.C. ch. 16—Public Library Services and Construction
- 20 U.S.C. ch. 17—National Defense Education Program
- 20 U.S.C. ch. 18—Grants for Teaching in the Education of Handicapped Children
- 20 U.S.C. ch. 18A—Early Education Programs for Handicapped Children
- 20 U.S.C. ch. 19—School Construction in Areas Affected by Federal Activities
- 20 U.S.C. ch. 20—Grants For Teaching in the Education by the Deaf
- 20 U.S.C. ch. 20A—National Technical Institute for the Deaf
- 20 U.S.C. ch. 20B—Gallaudet University
- 20 U.S.C. ch. 21—Higher Education Facilities
- 20 U.S.C. ch. 22—National Council on the Arts, the National Endowment for the Arts
- 20 U.S.C. ch. 23—Training and Fellowship Programs for Community Development
- 20 U.S.C. ch. 24—Grants for Educational Materials, Facilities and Services, and Strengthening of Educational Agencies
- 20 U.S.C. ch. 25—Pay and Personnel Program for Overseas Teachers
- 20 U.S.C. ch. 25A—Overseas Defense Dependents Education
- 20 U.S.C. ch. 26—Support and Scholarship in Humanities and Arts; Museum Services
- 20 U.S.C. ch. 26A—Indemnity For Exhibitions of Arts and Artifacts
- 20 U.S.C. ch. 27—National Vocational Student Loan Insurance
- 20 U.S.C. ch. 28—Higher Education Resources and Student Assistance
- 20 U.S.C. ch. 29—International Studies and Research
- 20 U.S.C. ch. 30—Basic Education for Adults
- 20 U.S.C. ch. 31—General Provisions Concerning Education
- 20 U.S.C. ch. 32—Vocational Education
- 20 U.S.C. ch. 33—Education of Individuals with Disabilities
- 20 U.S.C. ch. 34—National Commission on Libraries and Information Science
- 20 U.S.C. ch. 35—Environmental Education
- 20 U.S.C. ch. 36—Emergency School Aid
- 20 U.S.C. ch. 37—Assignment or Transportation Of Students
- 20 U.S.C. ch. 38—Discrimination Based on Sex or Blindness
- 20 U.S.C. ch. 39—Equal Educational Opportunities and Transportation of Students
- 20 U.S.C. ch. 40—Consolidation of Education Programs
- 20 U.S.C. ch. 41—National Reading Improvement Program
- 20 U.S.C. ch. 42—Harry S Truman Memorial Scholarships
- 20 U.S.C. ch. 43—American Folklife Preservation
- 20 U.S.C. ch. 44—Vocational and Technical Education
- 20 U.S.C. ch. 45—Career Education and Career Development
- 20 U.S.C. ch. 46—Career Education Incentive
- 20 U.S.C. ch. 47—Strengthening and Improvement of Elementary and Secondary Schools
- 20 U.S.C. ch. 48—Department of Education
- 20 U.S.C. ch. 49—Asbestos School Hazard Detection and Control
- 20 U.S.C. ch. 50—National Center for the Study of Afro-American History and Culture
- 20 U.S.C. ch. 51—Elementary and Secondary Education Block Grant
- 20 U.S.C. ch. 52—Education for Economic Security
  - Subchapter I - National Science Foundation Science and Engineering Education
  - Subchapter II - Education for Economic Security
  - Subchapter III - Partnerships in Education for Mathematics, Science, and Engineering
  - Subchapter IV - Presidential Awards for Teaching Excellence in Mathematics and Science
  - Subchapter V - Asbestos School Hazard Abatement
  - Subchapter VI - Excellence in Education Program
  - Subchapter VII - Magnet Schools Assistance
  - Subchapter VIII - Equal Access
  - Subchapter IX - Star Schools Program
- 20 U.S.C. ch. 53—Emergency Immigrant Education Assistance
- 20 U.S.C. ch. 54—Leadership in Educational Administration
- 20 U.S.C. ch. 55—Education of the Deaf
- 20 U.S.C. ch. 56—American Indian, Alaska Native, And Native Hawaiian Culture and Art Development
- 20 U.S.C. ch. 57—James Madison Memorial Fellowship Program
- 20 U.S.C. ch. 58—Drug-Free Schools and Communities
- 20 U.S.C. ch. 59—Barry Goldwater Scholarship and Excellence in Education Program
- 20 U.S.C. ch. 60—Fund for the Improvement and Reform of Schools and Teaching
- 20 U.S.C. ch. 61—Education for Native Hawaiians
- 20 U.S.C. ch. 62—Education and Training for American Competitiveness
- 20 U.S.C. ch. 63—Eisenhower Exchange Fellowship Program
- 20 U.S.C. ch. 64—Excellence in Mathematics, Science, and Engineering Education
- 20 U.S.C. ch. 65—National Environmental Education
- 20 U.S.C. ch. 66—Morris K. Udall Scholarship and Excellence in National Environmental Policy Foundation
- 20 U.S.C. ch. 67—Christopher Columbus Fellowship Foundation
- 20 U.S.C. ch. 68—National Education Reform
- 20 U.S.C. ch. 69—School-To-Work Opportunities
- 20 U.S.C. ch. 70—Strengthening and Improvement of Elementary and Secondary Schools
- 20 U.S.C. ch. 71—National Education Statistics
- 20 U.S.C. ch. 72—Museum and Library Services
- 20 U.S.C. ch. 73—Adult Education and Literacy
- 20 U.S.C. ch. 74—Troops-To-Teachers Program
- 20 U.S.C. ch. 75—Early Learning Opportunities
- 20 U.S.C. ch. 76—Education Research, Statistics, Evaluation, Information, and Dissemination
- 20 U.S.C. ch. 77—Financial Literacy and Education Improvement
