= Education reform in the United States =

Education reform in the United States has a long history and several barriers and persisting issues. Public education was first established in the United States in Boston, Massachusetts on April 23, 1635. In 1642, the General Court passed a law that required that all dependents, apprentices, servants, and children be taught to read English or face a fine, though access to secondary education was primarily limited to White males. A more unified system was established following the American Revolution. The model did not fully take hold until the 1830s.

During Reconstruction, the U.S. Supreme Court ruled in Plessy v. Ferguson that Black children were also entitled to a free public education, though segregation was still allowed based on race. State-sponsored segregation of public schools was ruled unconstitutional with Brown v. Board of Education in 1954. Further advancements in combating racial discrimination were made with the Civil Rights Act of 1964. Free education became accessible to children with disabilities in 1975 with the Education for All Handicapped Children Act of 1975. Further reforms followed throughout the remainder of the 20^{th} century, including the Education for Economic Security Act of 1984 and the Improving America’s Schools Act of 1994, among others.

The 21^{st} century saw standards- and outcomes-based education reform that culminated in the No Child Left Behind Act of 2001. These standards were replaced by the Every Student Succeeds Act in 2015 which focused on a holistic approach rather than assessment-based accountability models. The first Trump administration placed more emphasis on school choice and voucher programs, as well as technical training and career development. Racial and income disparities, internet access, infrastructure, funding in comparison to other developed nations, and improved attendance continue to be discussed for further reform.

== History ==
In the U.S. public education is characterized as any federally funded primary or secondary school, administered to some extent by the government, and charged with educating all citizens. Although there is typically a cost to attend some public higher education institutions, they are still considered part of public education."

=== Colonial America ===
In what would become the United States, the first public school was established in Boston, Massachusetts, on April 23, 1635. Puritan schoolmaster Philemon Pormont led instruction at the Boston Latin School. During this time, post-secondary education was a commonly utilized tool to distinguish one's social class and social status. Access to education was the "privilege of white, upper-class, Christian male children" in preparation for university education in ministry.

In colonial America, to maintain Puritan religious traditions, formal and informal education instruction focused on teaching literacy. All colonists needed to understand the written language on some fundamental level in order to read the Bible and the colony's written secular laws. Religious leaders recognized that each person should be "educated enough to meet the individual needs of their station in life and social harmony." The first compulsory education laws were passed in Massachusetts between 1642 and 1648 when religious leaders noticed not all parents were providing their children with proper education. These laws stated that all towns with 50 or more families were obligated to hire a schoolmaster to teach children reading, writing, and basic arithmetic.

"In 1642 the General Court passed a law that required heads of households to teach all their dependents — apprentices and servants as well as their own children — to read English or face a fine. Parents could provide the instruction themselves or hire someone else to do it. Selectmen were to keep 'a vigilant eye over their brethren and neighbors,' young people whose education was neglected could be removed from their parents or masters."

The 1647 law eventually led to establishing publicly funded district schools in all Massachusetts towns, although, despite the threat of fines, compliance and quality of public schools were less than satisfactory.

"Many towns were 'shamefully neglectful' of children's education. In 1718 '...by sad experience, it is found that many towns that not only are obliged by law, but are very able to support a grammar school, yet choose rather to incur and pay the fine or penalty than maintain a grammar school."

When John Adams drafted the Massachusetts Constitution in 1780, he included provisions for a comprehensive education law that guaranteed public education to "all" citizens. However, access to formal education in secondary schools and colleges was reserved for free, white males. During the 17th and 18th centuries, females received little or no formal education except for home learning or attending Dame Schools. Likewise, many educational institutions maintained a policy of refusing to admit Black applicants. The Virginia Code of 1819 outlawed teaching enslaved people to read or write.

=== Post-revolution ===
Soon after the American Revolution, early leaders, like Thomas Jefferson and John Adams, proposed the creation of a more "formal and unified system of publicly funded schools" to satiate the need to "build and maintain commerce, agriculture and shipping interests". Their concept of free public education was not well received and did not begin to take hold on until the 1830s. However, in 1790, evolving socio-cultural ideals in the Commonwealth of Pennsylvania led to the first significant and systematic reform in education legislation that mandated economic conditions would not inhibit a child's access to education:

"Constitution of the Commonwealth of Pennsylvania – 1790 ARTICLE VII Section I. The legislature shall, as soon as conveniently may be, provide, by law, for the establishment of schools throughout the state, in such manner that the poor may be taught gratis."

=== Reconstruction and the American Industrial Revolution ===
During Reconstruction, from 1865 to 1877, African Americans worked to encourage public education in the South. With the U.S. Supreme Court decision in Plessy v. Ferguson, which held that "segregated public facilities were constitutional so long as the black and white facilities were equal to each other", this meant that African American children were legally allowed to attend public schools, although these schools were still segregated based on race. However, by the mid-twentieth century, civil rights groups would challenge racial segregation.

During the second half of the nineteenth century (1870 and 1914), America's Industrial Revolution refocused the nation's attention on the need for a universally accessible public school system. Inventions, innovations, and improved production methods were critical to the continued growth of American manufacturing. To compete in the global economy, an overwhelming demand for literate workers that possessed practical training emerged. Citizens argued, "educating children of the poor and middle classes would prepare them to obtain good jobs, thereby strengthen the nation's economic position." Institutions became an essential tool in yielding ideal factory workers with sought-after attitudes and desired traits such as dependability, obedience, and punctuality. Vocationally oriented schools offered practical subjects like shop classes for students who were not planning to attend college for financial or other reasons. Not until the latter part of the 19th century did public elementary schools become available throughout the country. Although, it would be longer for children of color, girls, and children with special needs to attain access free public education.

=== Mid 20th and early 21st century (United states) ===
==== Civil rights reform ====
Systemic bias remained a formidable barrier. From the 1950s to the 1970s, many of the proposed and implemented reforms in U.S. education stemmed from the civil rights movement and related trends; examples include ending racial segregation, and busing for the purpose of desegregation, affirmative action, and banning of school prayer.

In the early 1950s, most U.S. public schools operated under a legally sanctioned racial segregation system. Civil Rights reform movements sought to address the biases that ensure unequal distribution of academic resources such as school funding, qualified and experienced teachers, and learning materials to those socially excluded communities. In the early 1950s, the NAACP lawyers brought class-action lawsuits on behalf of black schoolchildren and their families in Kansas, South Carolina, Virginia, and Delaware, petitioning court orders to compel school districts to let black students attend white public schools. Finally, in 1954, the U.S. Supreme Court rejected that framework with Brown v. Board of Education and declared state-sponsored segregation of public schools unconstitutional.

In 1964, Title VI of the Civil Rights Act "prohibited discrimination on the basis of race, color, and national origin in programs and activities receiving federal financial assistance." Educational institutions could now utilize public funds to implement in-service training programs to assist teachers and administrators in establishing desegregation plans.

In 1965, the Higher Education Act (HEA) authorizes federal aid for postsecondary students.

The Elementary and Secondary Education Act of 1965 (ESEA) represents the federal government's commitment to providing equal access to quality education; including those children from low-income families, limited English proficiency, and other minority groups. This legislation had positive retroactive implications for Historically Black Colleges and Universities, more commonly known as HBCUs.

"The Higher Education Act of 1965, as amended, defines an HBCU as: "…any historically black college or university that was established prior to 1964, whose principal mission was, and is, the education of black Americans, and that is accredited by a nationally recognized accrediting agency or association determined by the Secretary [of Education] to be a reliable authority as to the quality of training offered or is, according to such an agency or association, making reasonable progress toward accreditation."

Known as the Bilingual Education Act, Title VII of ESEA, offered federal aid to school districts to provide bilingual instruction for students with limited English speaking ability.

The Education Amendments of 1972 (Public Law 92-318, 86 Stat. 327) establishes the Education Division in the U.S. Department of Health, Education, and Welfare and the National Institute of Education. Title IX of the Education Amendments of 1972 states, "No person in the United States shall, on the basis of sex, be excluded from participation in, be denied the benefits of, or be subjected to discrimination under any education program or activity receiving Federal financial assistance."

Equal Educational Opportunities Act of 1974 - Civil Rights Amendments to the Elementary and Secondary Education Act of 1965:

"Title I: Bilingual Education Act - Authorizes appropriations for carrying out the provisions of this Act. Establishes, in the Office of Education, an Office of Bilingual Education through which the Commissioner of Education shall carry out his functions relating to bilingual education. Authorizes appropriations for school nutrition and health services, correction education services, and ethnic heritage studies centers.

Title II: Equal Educational Opportunities and the Transportation of Students: Equal Educational Opportunities Act - Provides that no state shall deny equal educational opportunity to an individual on account of his or her race, color, sex, or national origin by means of specified practices...

Title IV: Consolidation of Certain Education Programs: Authorizes appropriations for use in various education programs including libraries and learning resources, education for use of the metric system of measurement, gifted and talented children programs, community schools, career education, consumers' education, women's equity in education programs, and arts in education programs.

Community Schools Act - Authorizes the Commissioner to make grants to local educational agencies to assist in planning, establishing, expanding, and operating community education programs

Women's Educational Equity Act - Establishes the Advisory Council on Women's Educational Programs and sets forth the composition of such Council. Authorizes the Commissioner of Education to make grants to, and enter into contracts with, public agencies, private nonprofit organizations, and individuals for activities designed to provide educational equity for women in the United States.

Title V: Education Administration: Family Educational Rights and Privacy Act (FERPA)- Provides that no funds shall be made available under the General Education Provisions Act to any State or local educational agency or educational institution which denies or prevents the parents of students to inspect and review all records and files regarding their children.

Title VII: National Reading Improvement Program: Authorizes the Commissioner to contract with State or local educational agencies for the carrying out by such agencies, in schools having large numbers of children with reading deficiencies, of demonstration projects involving the use of innovative methods, systems, materials, or programs which show promise of overcoming such reading deficiencies."

In 1975, The Education for All Handicapped Children Act (Public Law 94-142) ensured that all handicapped children (age 3-21) receive a "free, appropriate public education" designed to meet their special needs.

==== 1980–1989: A Nation at Risk ====
During the 1980s, some of the momentum of education reform moved from the left to the right, with the release of A Nation at Risk, Ronald Reagan's efforts to reduce or eliminate the United States Department of Education.

"[T]he federal government and virtually all state governments, teacher training institutions, teachers' unions, major foundations, and the mass media have all pushed strenuously for higher standards, greater accountability, more "time on task," and more impressive academic results".

Per the shift in educational motivation, families sought institutional alternatives, including "charter schools, progressive schools, Montessori schools, Waldorf schools, Afrocentric schools, religious schools - or home school instruction in their communities."

In 1984 President Reagan enacted the Education for Economic Security Act

In 1989, the Child Development and Education Act of 1989 authorized funds for Head Start Programs to include child care services.

In the latter half of the decade, E. D. Hirsch put forth an influential attack on one or more versions of progressive education. Advocating an emphasis on "cultural literacy"—the facts, phrases, and texts.

See also Uncommon Schools.

==== 1990-1999: standards-based education model ====
In 1994, the land grant system was expanded via the Elementary and Secondary Education Act to include tribal colleges.

Most states and districts in the 1990s adopted outcome-based education (OBE) in some form or another. A state would create a committee to adopt standards, and choose a quantitative instrument to assess whether the students knew the required content or could perform the required tasks.

In 1992 The National Commission on Time and Learning, Extension revise funding for civic education programs and those educationally disadvantaged children."

In 1994 the Improving America's Schools Act (IASA) reauthorized the Elementary and Secondary Education Act of 1965; amended as The Eisenhower Professional Development Program; IASA designated Title I funds for low income and otherwise marginalized groups; i.e., females, minorities, individuals with disabilities, individuals with limited English proficiency (LEP). By tethering federal funding distributions to student achievement, IASA meant use high stakes testing and curriculum standards to hold schools accountable for their results at the same level as other students. The Act significantly increased impact aid for the establishment of the Charter School Program, drug awareness campaigns, bilingual education, and technology.

In 1998 The Charter School Expansion Act amended the Charter School Program, enacted in 1994.

==== 2000–2015: No Child Left Behind ====
Consolidated Appropriations Act of 2001 appropriated funding to repair educational institution's buildings as well as repair and renovate charter school facilities, reauthorized the Even Start program, and enacted the Children's Internet Protection Act.

The standards-based National Education Goals 2000, set by the U.S. Congress in the 1990s, were based on the principles of outcomes-based education. In 2002, the standards-based reform movement culminated as the No Child left Behind Act of 2001 where achievement standard were set by each individual state. This federal policy was active until 2015 in the United States .

An article released by CBNC.com said a principal Senate Committee will take into account legislation that reauthorizes and modernizes the Carl D. Perkins Act. President George Bush approved this statute in 2006 on August 12, 2006. This new bill will emphasize the importance of federal funding for various Career and Technical (CTE) programs that will better provide learners with in-demand skills. Pell Grants are specific amount of money is given by the government every school year for disadvantaged students who need to pay tuition fees in college.

At present, there are many initiatives aimed at dealing with these concerns like innovative cooperation between federal and state governments, educators, and the business sector. One of these efforts is the Pathways to Technology Early College High School (P-TECH). This six-year program was launched in cooperation with IBM, educators from three cities in New York, Chicago, and Connecticut, and over 400 businesses. The program offers students in high school and associate programs focusing on the STEM curriculum. The High School Involvement Partnership, private and public venture, was established through the help of Northrop Grumman, a global security firm. It has given assistance to some 7,000 high school students (juniors and seniors) since 1971 by means of one-on-one coaching as well as exposure to STEM areas and careers.

The Teacher Incentive Fund (TIF), established in 2006 by the U.S. Department of Education, was a federal grant program designed to strengthen educational outcomes by supporting performance-based compensation and professional development systems for teachers and principals in high-need schools. TIF aimed to recruit, retain, and reward effective educators through financial incentives linked to student achievement growth and other measures of educator effectiveness. The program reflected broader federal efforts during the 2000s and 2010s to promote accountability and improve teacher quality as part of comprehensive educational reform initiatives. Between 2006 and 2016, TIF awarded over $2 billion in grants to school districts, charter schools, and state education agencies, contributing to the development of performance-based compensation models across the country before being replaced by the Teacher and School Leader (TSL) Incentive Program under the Every Student Succeeds Act (ESSA).

==== 2016–2021: Every Student Succeeds Act ====
The American Reinvestment and Recovery Act, enacted in 2009, reserved more than $85 billion in public funds to be used for education.

The 2009 Council of Chief State School Officers and the National Governors Association launch the Common Core State Standards Initiative.

In 2012 the Obama administration launched the Race to the Top competition aimed at spurring K–12 education reform through higher standards.

"The Race to the Top – District competition will encourage transformative change within schools, targeted toward leveraging, enhancing, and improving classroom practices and resources.

The four key areas of reform include:

- Development of rigorous standards and better assessments
- Adoption of better data systems to provide schools, teachers, and parents with information about student progress
- Support for teachers and school leaders to become more effective
- Increased emphasis and resources for the rigorous interventions needed to turn around the lowest-performing schools"

In 2015, under the Obama administration, many of the more restrictive elements that were enacted under No Child Left Behind (NCLB, 2001), were removed in the Every Student Succeeds Act (ESSA, 2015) which limits the role of the federal government in school liability. Every Student Succeeds Act reformed educational standards by "moving away from such high stakes and assessment based accountability models" and focused on assessing student achievement from a holistic approach by utilizing qualitative measures. Some argue that giving states more authority can help prevent considerable discrepancies in educational performance across different states. ESSA was approved by former President Obama in 2015 which amended and empowered the Elementary and Secondary Education Act of 1965. The Department of Education has the choice to carry out measures in drawing attention to said differences by pinpointing lowest-performing state governments and supplying information on the condition and progress of each state on different educational parameters. It can also provide reasonable funding along with technical aid to help states with similar demographics collaborate in improving their public education programs.

==== Social and emotional learning: strengths-based education model ====
This uses a methodology that values purposeful engagement in activities that turn students into self-reliant and efficient learners. Holding on to the view that everyone possesses natural gifts that are unique to one's personality (e.g. computational aptitude, musical talent, visual arts abilities), it likewise upholds the idea that children, despite their inexperience and tender age, are capable of coping with anguish, able to survive hardships, and can rise above difficult times.

==== Trump administration ====
In 2017, Betsy DeVos was instated as the 11th Secretary of Education. A strong proponent of school choice, school voucher programs, and charter schools, DeVos was a much-contested choice as her own education and career had little to do with formal experience in the US education system. In a Republican-dominated senate, she received a 50–50 vote - a tie that was broken by Vice President Mike Pence. Prior to her appointment, DeVos received a BA degree in business economics from Calvin College in Grand Rapids, Michigan and she served as chairman of an investment management firm, The Windquest Group. She supported the idea of leaving education to state governments under the new K-12 legislation. DeVos cited the interventionist approach of the federal government to education policy following the signing of the ESSA. The primary approach to that rule has not changed significantly. Her opinion was that the education movement populist politics or populism encouraged reformers to commit promises which were not very realistic and therefore difficult to deliver.

On July 31, 2018, President Donald Trump signed the Strengthening Career and Technical Education for the 21st Century Act (HR 2353) The Act reauthorized the Carl D. Perkins Career and Technical Education Act, a $1.2 billion program modified by the United States Congress in 2006. A move to change the Higher Education Act was also deferred.

The legislation enacted on July 1, 2019, replaced the Carl D. Perkins Career and Technical Education (Perkins IV) Act of 2006. Stipulations in Perkins V enables school districts to make use of federal subsidies for all students' career search and development activities in the middle grades as well as comprehensive guidance and academic mentoring in the upper grades. At the same time, this law revised the meaning of "special populations" to include homeless persons, foster youth, those who left the foster care system, and children with parents on active duty in the United States armed forces.

== Barriers ==
=== Education inequalities facing students of color ===
Another factor to consider in education reform is that of equity and access. Contemporary issues in the United States regarding education faces a history of inequalities that come with consequences for education attainment across different social groups. For example, students of color often attend underfunded schools, have less access to advanced classes, and face higher suspension rates, which all impact their chances of graduating and going to college.

==== Racial and socioeconomic class segregation ====
A history of racial, and subsequently class, segregation in the U.S. resulted from practices of law. Residential segregation is a direct result of twentieth century policies that separated by race using zoning and redlining practices, in addition to other housing policies, whose effects continue to endure in the United States. These neighborhoods that have been segregated de jure—by force of purposeful public policy at the federal, state, and local levels—disadvantage people of color as students must attend school near their homes.

With the inception of the New Deal between 1933 and 1939, and during and following World War II, federally funded public housing was explicitly racially segregated by the local government in conjunction with federal policies through projects that were designated for Whites or Black Americans in the South, Northeast, Midwest, and West. Following an ease on the housing shortage post-World War II, the federal government subsidized the relocation of Whites to suburbs. The Federal Housing and Veterans Administration constructed such developments on the East Coast in towns like Levittown on Long Island, New Jersey, Pennsylvania, and Delaware. On the West Coast, there was Panorama City, Lakewood, Westlake, and Seattle suburbs developed by Bertha and William Boeing. As White families left for the suburbs, Black families remained in public housing and were explicitly placed in Black neighborhoods. Policies such as public housing director, Harold Ickes', "neighborhood composition rule" maintained this segregation by establishing that public housing must not interfere with pre-existing racial compositions of neighborhoods. Federal loan guarantees were given to builders who adhered to the condition that no sales were made to Black families and each deed prohibited re-sales to Black families, what the Federal Housing Administration (FHA) described as an "incompatible racial element". In addition, banks and savings intuitions refused loans to Black families in White suburbs and Black families in Black neighborhoods. In the mid-twentieth century, urban renewal programs forced low-income black residents to reside in places farther from universities, hospitals, or business districts and relocation options consisted of public housing high-rises and ghettos.

This history of de jure segregation has impacted resource allocation for public education in the United States, with schools continuing to be segregated by race and class. Low-income White students are more likely than Black students to be integrated into middle-class neighborhoods and less likely to attend schools with other predominantly disadvantaged students. Students of color disproportionately attend underfunded schools and Title I schools in environments entrenched in environmental pollution and stagnant economic mobility with limited access to college readiness resources. According to research, schools attended by primarily Hispanic or African American students often have high turnover of teaching staff and are labeled high-poverty schools, in addition to having limited educational specialists, less available extracurricular opportunities, greater numbers of provisionally licensed teachers, little access to technology, and buildings that are not well maintained. With this segregation, more local property tax is allocated to wealthier communities and public schools' dependence on local property taxes has led to large disparities in funding between neighboring districts. The top 10% of wealthiest school districts spend approximately ten times more per student than the poorest 10% of school districts.

==== Racial wealth gap ====
This history of racial and socioeconomic class segregation in the U.S. has manifested into a racial wealth divide. With this history of geographic and economic segregation, trends illustrate a racial wealth gap that has impacted educational outcomes and its concomitant economic gains for minorities. Wealth or net worth—the difference between gross assets and debt—is a stock of financial resources and a significant indicator of financial security that offers a more complete measure of household capability and functioning than income. Within the same income bracket, the chance of completing college differs for White and Black students. Nationally, White students are at least 11% more likely to complete college across all four income groups. Intergenerational wealth is another result of this history, with White college-educated families three times as likely as Black families to get an inheritance of $10,000 or more. 10.6% of White children from low-income backgrounds and 2.5% of Black children from low-income backgrounds reach the top 20% of income distribution as adults. Less than 10% of Black children from low-income backgrounds reach the top 40%.

==== Access to early childhood education ====
These disadvantages facing students of color are apparent early on in early childhood education. By the age of five, children of color are impacted by opportunity gaps indicated by poverty, school readiness gap, segregated low-income neighborhoods, implicit bias, and inequalities within the justice system as Hispanic and African American boys account for as much as 60% of total prisoners within the incarceration population. These populations are also more likely to experience adverse childhood experiences (ACEs).

High-quality early care and education are less accessible to children of color, particularly African American preschoolers as findings from the National Center for Education Statistics show that in 2013, 40% of Hispanic and 36% White children were enrolled in learning center-based classrooms rated as high, while 25% of African American children were enrolled in these programs. 15% of African American children attended low ranking center-based classrooms. In home-based settings, 30% of White children and over 50% of Hispanic and African American children attended low rated programs.

== Contemporary issues ==
In the first decade of the 21st century, several issues are salient in debates over further education reform:

- Longer school day or school year
- After-school tutoring
- Charter schools, school choice, or school vouchers
- Smaller class sizes
- Improved teacher quality
  - Improved training
  - Higher credential standards
  - Generally higher pay to attract more qualified applicants
  - Performance bonuses ("merit pay")
  - Firing low-performing teachers
- Internet and computer access in schools
- Track and reduce drop-out rate
- Track and reduce absenteeism
- English-only vs. bilingual education
- Mainstreaming or fully including students with special educational needs, rather than placing them in separate special schools
- Content of curriculum standards and textbooks
  - What to teach, at what age, and to which students. Discussion points include the age at which children should learn to read, and the primary mathematical subject that is taught to adolescents – algebra, or statistics or personal finances.
- Funding, neglected infrastructure, and adequacy of educational supplies
- Student rights
- Education inequalities facing students of color

=== Private interest in American charter schools ===
Charter schools public independent institutions in which both the cost and risk are fully funded by the taxpayers. Some charter schools are nonprofit in name only and are structured in ways that individuals and private enterprises connected to them can make money. Other charter schools are for-profit. In many cases, the public is largely unaware of this rapidly changing educational landscape, the debate between public and private/market approaches, and the decisions that are being made that affect their children and communities. Critics have accused for-profit entities, (education management organizations, EMOs) and private foundations such as the Bill and Melinda Gates Foundation, the Eli and Edythe Broad Foundation, and the Walton Family Foundation of funding Charter school initiatives to undermine public education and turn education into a "Business Model" which can make a profit. In some cases a school's charter is held by a non-profit that chooses to contract all of the school's operations to a third party, often a for-profit, CMO. This arrangement is defined as a vendor-operated school, (VOS).

=== School choice ===
Economists, such as the late Nobel laureate Milton Friedman, advocate for school choice to promote excellence in education through competition and choice. Proponents claim that a competitive market for schooling provides a workable method of accountability for results. Public education vouchers permit guardians to select and pay any school, public or private, with public funds that were formerly allocated directly to local public schools. The theory is that children's guardians will naturally shop for the best schools for their children, much as is already done at college level.

Many reforms based on school choice have led to slight to moderate improvements. Some teachers' union members see those improvements as insufficient to offset the decreased teacher pay and job security. For instance, New Zealand's landmark reform in 1989, during which schools were granted substantial autonomy, funding was devolved to schools, and parents were given a free choice of which school their children would attend, led to moderate improvements in most schools. It was argued that the associated increases in inequity and greater racial stratification in schools nullified the educational gains. Others, however, argued that the original system created more inequity, due to lower income students being required to attend poorer performing inner city schools and not being allowed school choice or better educations that are available to higher income inhabitants of suburbs. Thus, it was argued that school choice promoted social mobility and increased test scores, especially in the cases of low income students. Similar results have been found in other jurisdictions. The small improvements produced by some school choice policies seem to reflect weaknesses in the ways that choice is implemented, rather than a failure of the basic principle itself.

=== Teacher tenure ===
Critics of teacher tenure claim that the laws protect ineffective teachers from being fired, which can be detrimental to student success. Tenure laws vary from state to state, but generally they set a probationary period during which the teacher proves themselves worthy of the lifelong position. Probationary periods range from one to three years. Advocates for tenure reform often consider these periods too short to make such an important decision; especially when that decision is exceptionally hard to revoke. Due process restriction protect tenured teachers from being wrongfully fired; however these restrictions can also prevent administrators from removing ineffective or inappropriate teachers. A 2008 survey conducted by the US Department of Education found that, on average, only 2.1% of teachers are dismissed each year for poor performance.

In October 2010 Apple Inc. CEO Steve Jobs had a consequential meeting with U.S. President Barack Obama to discuss U.S. competitiveness and the nation's education system. During the meeting Jobs recommended pursuing policies that would make it easier for school principals to hire and fire teachers based on merit.

In 2012 tenure for school teachers was challenged in a California lawsuit called Vergara v. California. The primary issue in the case was the impact of tenure on student outcomes and on equity in education. On June 10, 2014, the trial judge ruled that California's teacher tenure statute produced disparities that "shock the conscience" and violate the equal protection clause of the California Constitution.

=== Funding levels ===
According to a 2005 report from the OECD, the United States is tied for first place with Switzerland when it comes to annual spending per student on its public schools, with each of those two countries spending more than $11,000 (in U.S. currency). Despite this high level of funding, U.S. public schools lag behind the schools of other rich countries in the areas of reading, math, and science. A further analysis of developed countries shows no correlation between per student spending and student performance, suggesting that there are other factors influencing education. Top performers include Singapore, Finland and Korea, all with relatively low spending on education, while high spenders including Norway and Luxembourg have relatively low performance. One possible factor is the distribution of the funding.

In the US, schools in wealthy areas tend to be over-funded while schools in poorer areas tend to be underfunded. These differences in spending between schools or districts may accentuate inequalities, if they result in the best teachers moving to teach in the most wealthy areas. The inequality between districts and schools led to 23 states instituting school finance reform based on adequacy standards that aim to increase funding to low-income districts. A 2018 study found that between 1990 and 2012, these finance reforms led to an increase in funding and test scores in the low income districts; which suggests finance reform is effective at bridging inter-district performance inequalities. It has also been shown that the socioeconomic situation of the students family has the most influence in determining success; suggesting that even if increased funds in a low income area increase performance, they may still perform worse than their peers from wealthier districts.

Starting in the early 1980s, a series of analyses by Eric Hanushek indicated that the amount spent on schools bore little relationship to student learning. This controversial argument, which focused attention on how money was spent instead of how much was spent, led to lengthy scholarly exchanges. In part the arguments fed into the class size debates and other discussions of "input policies." It also moved reform efforts towards issues of school accountability (including No Child Left Behind) and the use of merit pay and other incentives.

There have been studies that show smaller class sizes and newer buildings (both of which require higher funding to implement) lead to academic improvements. It should also be noted that many of the reform ideas that stray from the traditional format require greater funding.

According to a 1999 article, William J. Bennett, former U.S. Secretary of Education, argued that increased levels of spending on public education have not made the schools better, citing the following statistics:

== See also ==
- Charter schools in the United States
- Educational inequality in the United States
- Achievement gaps in the United States
- Racial achievement gap in the United States
- Desegregation busing
- Sex differences in education in the United States
- Head Start (program)
- School choice
- Racial diversity in United States schools
- School segregation in the United States
- Standards-based education reform in the United States
