= National Skill Standards Board =

The National Skill Standards Board (NSSB) was a coalition of community, business, labor, education, and civil rights leaders. It was tasked with building a national voluntary system of skill standards, assessment, and certification to enhance the ability of the United States workforce to compete effectively in the global economy.

== History ==
NSSB gathered research on the creation of skill requirements, skill assessments, and certification processes. The board developed research protocols for validating skills across an entire Industry, the development of quality criteria for all elements of that system, and the designs for a continuous improvement strategy.

In 2001, the Manufacturing Skill Standards Board (MSSC) released "A Blueprint for Workforce Excellence" the nation's first skill standards developed under a common format and common language for all sectors of manufacturing. The skill standards represent the best practices for high-performance work and define the skills and knowledge required to ensure a skilled, mobile industrial workforce. The standards include national validation of the specific job functions in best practice work sites which when the job is completed successfully. They also establish the level of technical knowledge and skills needed for the job. The three distinct levels of skill standards: core, concentration and specialized.

In 2003, federal entity NSSB became The National Skill Standards Board Institute (NSSBI). This was a membership foundation which would continue research and development related to the development and use of Industry skills requirements, skills assessment for learning or selection, and certifications.

David Wilcox, the Deputy Director of the NSSB in 2003, founded a new firm called Global Skills X-Change (GSX), that equips organizations and the workforces they rely on with the tools, programs, and capabilities to adapt to today’s rapidly changing conditions

== Workforce categorization ==
The NSSB categorized the entire United States’ workforce into just 15 industry sectors. Those sectors include:

- Agriculture, Forestry, and Fishing
- Business and Administrative Services
- Construction
- Education and Training
- Finance and Insurance
- Health and Human Services
- Manufacturing, Installation, and Repair
- Mining
- Public Administration, Legal, and Protective Services
- Restaurants, Lodging, Hospitality and Tourism, and Amusement and Recreation
- Retail Trade, Wholesale Trade, Real Estate, and Personal Services
- Scientific and Technical Services
- Telecommunications, Computers, Arts and Entertainment, and Information
- Transportation
- Utilities and Environmental and Waste Management.

== The National Skill Standards Act of 1994 ==
The National Skill Standards Act of 1994 established "a National Skill Standards Board to serve as a catalyst in stimulating the development and adoption of a voluntary national system of skill standards and of assessment and certification of attainment of skill standards:"

(1) that will serve as a cornerstone of the national strategy to enhance workforce skills;
(2) that will result in increased productivity, economic growth, and American economic competitiveness; and
(3) that can be used, consistent with civil rights laws--

(A) by the Nation, to ensure the development of a high skills, high quality, high performance workforce, including the most skilled frontline workforce in the world;
(B) by industries, as a vehicle for informing training providers and prospective employees of skills necessary for employment;
(C) by employers, to assist in evaluating the skill levels of prospective employees and to assist in the training of current employees;
(D) by labor organizations, to enhance the employment security of workers by providing portable credentials and skills;
(E) by workers, to--

(i) obtain certifications of their skills to protect against dislocation;
(ii) pursue career advancement; and
(iii) enhance their ability to reenter the workforce;

(F) by students and entry level workers, to determine the skill levels and competencies needed to be obtained in order to compete effectively for high wage jobs;
(G) by training providers and educators, to determine appropriate training services to offer;
(H) by government, to evaluate whether publicly funded training assists participants to meet skill standards where such standards exist and thereby protect the integrity of public expenditures;
(I) to facilitate the transition to high performance work organizations;
(J) to increase opportunities for minorities and women, including removing barriers to the entry of women into nontraditional employment; and
(K) to facilitate linkages between other components of the national strategy to enhance workforce skills, including school-to-work transition, secondary and postsecondary vocational-technical education, and job training programs.

$15,000,000 was authorized for fiscal year 1994 for this act.

== See also ==
- Human resources
- Certificate of Initial Mastery
- NCEE
- Standards based education reform
- Apprenticeship
