= Standards-based education reform in the United States =

Education reform in the United States since the 1980s has been largely driven by the setting of academic standards for what students should know and be able to do. These standards can then be used to guide all other system components. The SBE (standards-based education) reform movement calls for clear, measurable standards for all school students. Rather than norm-referenced rankings, a standards-based system measures each student against the concrete standard. Curriculum, assessments, and professional development are aligned to the standards.

== Outcomes-based education ==
Standards are an evolution of the earlier OBE (outcomes-based education) which was largely rejected in the United States as unworkable in the 1990s, and is still being implemented by some and abandoned by other governments. In contrast, the more modest "standards" reform has been limited to the core goals of the OBE programs:

- the creation of curriculum frameworks which outline specific knowledge or skills which students must acquire,
- an emphasis on criterion-referenced assessments which are aligned to the frameworks, and
- the imposition of some high-stakes tests, such as graduation examinations requiring a high standard of performance to receive a diploma.

In the process of establishing standards for each individual curriculum area, such as mathematics and science, many other reforms, such as inquiry-based science may be implemented, but these are not core aspects of the standards program.

The standards movement can be traced to the efforts of Marc Tucker's NCEE which adapted aspects of William Spady's OBE movement into a system based on creating standards and assessments for a Certificate of Initial Mastery. This credential has since been abandoned by every state which first adopted the concept, including Washington and Oregon and largely replaced by graduation examinations. His organization had contracts with states and districts covering as many as half of all American school children by their own claims, and many states enacted education reform legislation in the early 1990s based on this model, which was also known at the time as "performance-based education" as OBE (and the non-OBE progressive reforms co-marketed with it) had been too widely attacked to be saleable under that name. Though the standards movement has a stronger backing from conservatives than OBE by adopting a platform of raising higher academic standards, other conservatives believe that it is merely a re-labeling of a failed, unrealistic vision. It is believed to be the educational equivalent of a planned economy which attempts to require all children to perform at world-class levels merely by raising expectations and imposing punishments and sanctions on schools and children who fall short of the new standards.

== Vision ==
The vision of the standards-based education reform movement is that all teenagers will receive a meaningful high school diploma that serves essentially as a public guarantee that they can read, write, and do basic mathematics (typically through first-year algebra) at a level which might be useful to an employer. To avoid a surprising failure at the end of high school, standards trickle down through all the lower grades, with regular assessments through a variety of means.

No student, by virtue of poverty, age, race, gender, cultural or ethnic background, disabilities, or family situation will ultimately be exempt from learning the required material, although it is acknowledged that individual students may learn in different ways and at different rates.

In the United States, education is more of a state and local responsibility. Educational standards are primarily decided on by local school districts and varying public and private organizations. These standards are put in place, as stated below, to help students, teachers, parents, etc. to know what is expected of a certain child at a certain age to know by the end of a unit, term, school year, etc. Standards are normally published and freely available to parents and taxpayers as well as professional educators and textbook writers. There are some things that are not controlled by state and local governments and instead by the federal government. Some of these things include, establishing legislation and standards, providing funding, and ensuring that all students have access to quality education. Standards focus on the goal of a literate and economically competitive workforce.

- Standards outline what students need to know, understand, and be able to do.
- Standards should be developmentally appropriate and relevant to future employment and education needs. Standards should generally be written so that all students are capable of achieving them, and so that talented students will exceed them.
- All students are believed to be capable of learning and of meeting high expectations. Both advanced and struggling students can learn new things in their own ways and at their own rates.
- Instruction that helps an individual student learn the information and skills listed in the standards is emphasized.
- Both excellence and equity are valued. Subgroups are carefully measured to identify and reduce systemic racism, bias, and the tyranny of low expectations.
- Professional teachers are empowered to make the decisions essential for effective learning, rather than having a teaching style prescribed under traditional education models.
- Social promotion is discouraged. Students advance or are retained based on their actual learning achievements instead of based on their age, their friends' achievements, or tradition.

== Components ==
Some of the common components of standards-based education reform are:

- Creation of specific, concrete, measurable standards in an integrated curriculum framework. These standards apply to all schools in a state or country, regardless of race or relative wealth.
- Criterion-referenced tests based on these standards rather than norm-based relative rankings (which compare one student with another).
- An assertion that the new standards are higher than the pre-reform expectations for middle-class or upper-middle-class students.
- A requirement that attention be paid to narrowing academic gaps between groups such as races, income, or gender.
- High school graduation examinations, which are a form of high-stakes testing that denies diplomas to students who do not meet the stated standards, such as being able to read at the eighth-grade level or do pre-algebra mathematics. The Regents Examination in New York, first given in 1878, is the oldest high school graduation exam in the U.S. In most educational systems, students who can not pass the test are given a certificate of attendance instead of a normal diploma.

== History ==
Standards-based education reform in the United States began with the publication of A Nation at Risk in 1983.

In 1989, an education summit involving all fifty state governors and President George H. W. Bush resulted in the adoption of national education goals for the year 2000; the goals included content standards. That same year, the National Council of Teachers of Mathematics published the Curriculum and Evaluation Standards for School Mathematics, a standards-based document.

A standards based vision was enacted under the Clinton Administration in 1994. A reauthorization of the Elementary and Secondary Education Act (ESEA) was passed to ensure that all states had rigorous standards for all subject areas and grade levels. This vision was then carried forward by the Bush Administration in 2001 with the passing of No Child Left Behind (NCLB).

Standards-based school reform has become a predominant issue facing public schools. By the 1996 National Education Summit, 44 governors and 50 corporate CEOs set the priorities (Achieve, 1998)

- High academic standards and expectations for all students.
- Tests that are more rigorous and more challenging, to measure whether students are meeting those standards.
- Accountability systems that provide incentives and rewards for educators, students, and parents to work together to help students reach these standards.

By 1998, almost every state had implemented or was in the process of implementing academic standards for their students in math and reading. Principals and teachers have received bonuses or been fired, students have been promoted or retained in their current grade, and legislation has been passed so that high school students will graduate or be denied a diploma based on whether or not they had met the standards, usually as measured by a criterion-referenced test.

The standards-based National Education Goals (Goals 2000) were set by the U.S. Congress in the 1990s. Many of these goals were based on the principles of outcomes-based education, and not all of the goals were attained by the year 2000 as was intended. The movement resulted in the No Child Left Behind Act (NCLB) of 2001, which required that states make yearly progress towards having all students be proficient by 2014, as evidenced by annual standardized testing. In response to growing public disapproval with NCLB as the deadline approached without any state being able to reach this goal, the Obama administration began granting waivers to states exempting them from NCLB testing requirements. The waivers were linked to various reforms, such as the adoption of common standards by a consortium of states, of which the Common Core was the only one. In December 2015, President Obama signed the Every Student Succeeds Act into law devolving many of NCLB's testing requirements to the states.

== Critics ==
Aspects of standards-based education reform came under scrutiny in the 1990s. Some education researchers, such as UCLA's Gary Orfield, disagreed that all students should pass a rigorous test just to get a high school diploma. Others, such as the website Mathematically Correct, questioned the NCTM standards approach to teaching mathematics from 1997 to 2003. Some state standards have been criticized for either not being specific as to academic content, or not implementing curricula which follow the new standards. Advocates of traditional education believe it is not realistic to expect all students to perform at the same level as the best students, nor to punish students simply because they do not perform as well as the most academically talented.

== See also ==
- Concept inventory
- Outcomes-based education
- Reform mathematics, which emphasizes deep understanding and practical applications rather than abstract academic mathematics
- School to work programs recommended by some OBE and SBE programs
