= National Education Summit of 1989 =

Bush administration meeting with governors

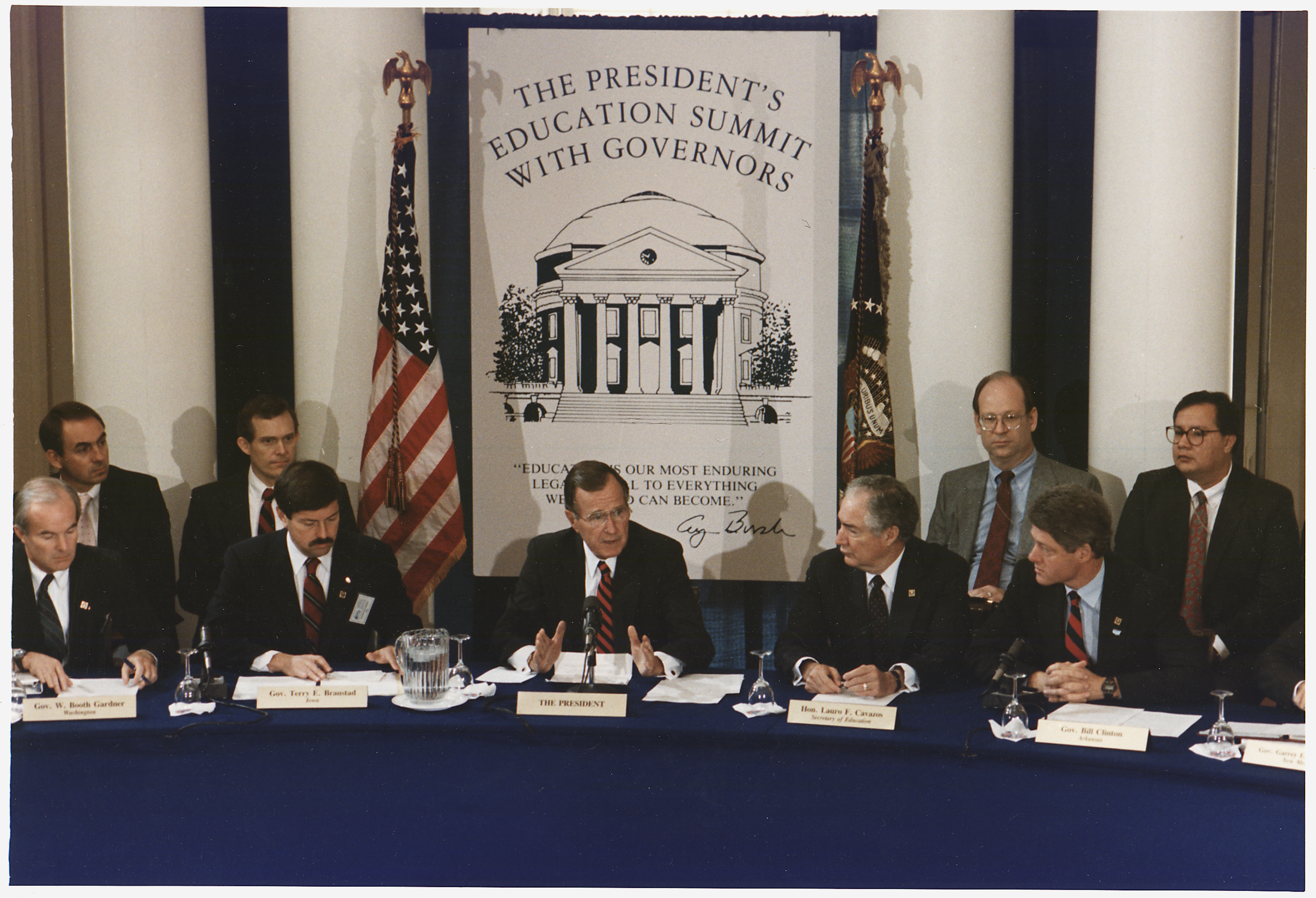
President Bush and other participants at the summit.

The National Education Summit of 1989 was a meeting between President George H. W. Bush and 49 of the 50 governors of the United States to discuss national education policy. The summit was held in Charlottesville, Virginia, on September 27–28, 1989. The meeting resulted in the development of the National Education Goals and influenced national and state education policy in the following years.

== Background ==
Concerns arose in the late 1970s and early 1980s that American education policy was insufficient. While test scores remained relatively stable and most parents approved of local schools, policymakers feared that a lack of standards-based education policy was weakening the economy and preventing the United States from competing internationally. The Department of Education formed the National Commission on Excellence in Education in 1981, and it produced its report, A Nation at Risk, in 1983. The report was heavily critical of the state of education in the United States, and it prompted further concern for American education policy. A wave of state level education reforms took place in the 1980s. State governors were regarded as the leaders of school reform efforts in the late 1980s, as education was primarily legislated at the state level. The National Governors Association made education policy a priority, and it promoted the creation of national education standards and monitoring.

While campaigning for the Republican nomination in 1988, Bush expressed a desire to be "the education president". After winning the 1988 presidential election, Bush met with state governors, and an agreement was made to pursue a meeting on education policy. Bush met privately with 13 governors in May 1989, and the proposal of an education summit was positively received. Bush announced the summit at a National Governors Association meeting in July 1989. It was the third time in American history that a U.S. president had called a meeting of the nation's governors, preceded by Theodore Roosevelt's 1908 Conference of Governors and a summit that followed the 1933 inauguration of Franklin D. Roosevelt. On September 13, the National Governors Association met with 40 representatives from various advocacy organizations. Governors Bill Clinton and Carroll A. Campbell Jr. led preparations for the summit.

== Summit ==
The summit took place at the University of Virginia in Charlottesville, Virginia, from September 27 to 28, 1989. It was attended by the governors of 49 of the 50 states, the only absence being Governor Rudy Perpich of Minnesota, who had to preside over a special legislative session. In addition to President Bush, the summit was generally overseen by Governor Clinton in his role as Chairman of the National Governors Association and by Roger B. Porter in his role as Director of the Domestic Policy Council. The summit was split into six working groups, focusing on teaching, the learning environment, governance, choice and restructuring, competitive workforce and life-long learning, and post-secondary education, respectively. A joint statement by Bush and the governors was released at the end of the summit on September 28.

The summit resulted in six National Education Goals to be addressed by state governments and the federal government. The goals were designed to be highly aspirational with the expectation that it would prompt stronger governmental action to achieve them. President Bush announced these goals during the 1990 State of the Union Address, all intended to be accomplished by the year 2000:

- All children will start school ready to learn.
- The high school graduation rate will increase to at least 90 percent.
- American students will leave grades 4, 8, and 12 having demonstrated competency in challenging subject matter, including English, mathematics, science, history, and geography, and every school in America will ensure that all students learn to use their minds well, so they may be prepared for responsible citizenship, further learning, and productive employment in our modern economy.
- U.S. students will be first in the world in mathematics and science achievement.
- Every adult American will be literate and will possess the skills necessary to compete in a global economy and exercise the rights and responsibilities of citizenship.
- Every school in America will be free of drugs and violence and will offer a disciplined learning environment conducive to learning.

The National Education Goals Panel was established in 1990 to report on the nation's progress toward these goals.

== Aftermath ==
The summit was celebrated as a major accomplishment in federal-state cooperation and in bipartisanship, though disagreements persisted after the summit regarding how to create the framework to meet the established goals. The policy goals reached during the summit would influence national education policy for decades. Bush proposed the America 2000 plan to address the summit's education goals, but it was not passed by Congress. The Clinton administration developed the Goals 2000 plan based on America 2000. Congress passed this plan, as well as the Improving America's Schools Act of 1994. The No Child Left Behind Act further built on the standards-based education policy goals developed during the summit and was passed in 2002.

Three additional National Education Summit meetings occurred in 1996, 1999, and 2001 in Palisades, New York, where the nation's governors assessed progress toward these goals. The 2005 National Education Summit on High Schools in Washington, D.C., was the last of these nationwide meetings.

Between 1992 and 2017, significant progress had been made for African American and Hispanic American students. In 1992, 78% of African American eighth-graders scored below basic in math, and by 2017 this number was reduced to 53%.
