= National Standards for United States History =

1994 proposal for standards in history education

National Standards for United States History is a 1994 publication by the National Center for History in the Schools (NCHS), a federally-funded unit of the University of California, Los Angeles (UCLA), setting forth proposed voluntary standards for K–12 education on the history of the United States. In 1991, the administration of U.S. President George H. W. Bush provided $2 million in funding for the project, and "several thousand teachers, educators, officials, and scholars" participated in its preparation. While some scholars called it a "remarkable achievement in the history of the humanities", it drew substantial criticism from conservatives who said that it placed too much focus on the sordid parts of American history. A non-binding resolution in the United States Senate disapproved of the standards and implied they lacked "a decent respect for the contributions of western civilization, and United States history, ideas, and institutions, to the increase of freedom and prosperity around the world". As a result of the controversy, the National Council on Education Standards and Testing and the National Education Goals Panel never certified the standards.

== Background ==
In the United States, there historically have been no national standards for public education; school curricula are controlled by approximately 15,000 independent public school districts which are subject to varying degrees of oversight by the governments of each of the 50 states. In the 1980s, an education reform movement advocated for the federal government to take a more active role in the oversight of education policy. The United States Department of Education was created in 1980, with education policy reform as one of its goals. Since its inception, the Department of Education has been criticized by conservatives as a needless intrusion by the federal government into local control of public education.

The first set of national standards for K–12 education in a subject was Curriculum and Evaluation Standards for School Mathematics, published by the National Council of Teachers of Mathematics in 1989. That same year, 49 of the 50 state governors and President George H. W. Bush gathered in Charlottesville, Virginia, for the National Education Summit. At the summit, the National Education Goals were developed, and the attendees agreed that "clear, national performance goals" were needed in all subjects.

The National Center for History in the Schools was established in 1988, created by UCLA and funded by a federal grant from the National Endowment for the Humanities (NEH). Charlotte Crabtree, who had participated in the writing of the California state history standards adopted in 1987, was named the NCHS's director. Gary Nash, who had helped write Houghton Mifflin's series of social studies textbooks, was made associate director. The center's first major project was Lessons From History: Essential Understanding and Historical Perspectives Students Should Acquire, a framework for K–12 history education. In December 1991, NEH chair Lynne Cheney and U.S. Secretary of Education Lamar Alexander announced that the NCHS would receive a $1.6 million grant to develop voluntary standards for history education in public schools across the United States.

The NCHS spent 32 months developing a set of standards, with Nash serving as the chair and Crabtree as the co-chair of the project, and "several thousand teachers, educators, officials, and scholars" participating in the process. While the center was initially expected to use Lessons From History as the template for its more detailed set of standards, the members quickly agreed that the document was insufficient for this purpose. Three of the five planned publications were released in November 1994: National Standards for United States History, National Standards for World History, and National Standards for Grades K-4.

== Controversy ==
Two weeks before the standards were scheduled to be published, on October 20, 1994, an editorial by Lynne Cheney was published in the Wall Street Journal titled "The End of History". In it, Cheney sharply criticized National Standards for United States History, describing it as "politically correct" and frequently excluding figures from "traditional history" in favor of a "revisionist agenda". She wrote that she had approved the grant which funded the project because she expected it to build on Lessons From History, and that she was "troubled by the way that the history standards have turned out". Her analysis was based mostly on counting the number of times that certain names appear in the document, claiming for example that "not a single one of the 31 standards mentions the Constitution" while Joseph McCarthy and McCarthyism were mentioned 19 times.

Gary Nash and co-author Ross Dunn responded to these criticisms, saying that Cheney and others engaged in "selective and devious nose-counting" and that the standards were not intended as "extended narrative essays on all the knowledge American kids should have." To the point that Ulysses S. Grant was mentioned only once in the standards and Robert E. Lee not at all, Nash and Dunn wrote that the standards already said that students should study "military leadership, North and South, in the Civil War, but it does not provide lists or biographical sketches of prominent generals. To suggest, as Cheney has, that [...] teachers and textbook publishers will conclude that they are obligated to eliminate these men from the study of civil war leadership[,] is patently silly and an insult to history educators." Some of Cheney's claims in the editorial were inaccurate: for instance, the standards contained two subsections devoted to the Constitution and the Bill of Rights and mentioned the Constitution 177 times.

The Wall Street Journal editorial brought National Standards for United States History into the ongoing "culture wars", more specifically the "American history wars", in which the historiography of the United States is debated in academic and popular media. On October 28, 1994, Rush Limbaugh spoke about the standards on his television show, tearing pages out of a book to represent the alleged erasure of certain historical figures from public education that he claimed would ensue if the standards were adopted. In the months that followed, the standards were debated in various popular media forums, with opponents arguing that the teaching of American history should be "celebratory" and not as "critical" as the standards were said to be. In popular media, the standards were frequently and inaccurately described as a national curriculum which the Clinton administration supposedly intended to force schools to adopt; in fact, they were always intended as recommendations which schools could voluntarily choose to adopt in whole, in part, or not at all.

In January 1995, Senator Slade Gorton (R–WA) proposed an amendment to the Unfunded Mandates Reform Act of 1995, which would have blocked the standards from being certified by the relevant federal agencies and prohibited any future federal grant funding from being sent to the NCHS. This amendment was expected to be supported mostly by Republicans, who then held the majority of both houses of Congress, and opposed mostly by Democrats. To prevent the amendment from passing, Senator Jeff Bingaman (D–NM) suggested that a non-binding resolution opposing the standards but lacking any legal force to prohibit them should be unanimously passed by both parties. Gorton agreed, and the resulting resolution passed by a vote of 99–1. The resolution recommended that federal history standards "should not be based on standards developed primarily by the National Center for History in the Schools prior to February 1, 1995" (allowing for the possibility of future revisions by the NCHS) and said that any future grants for history standards development should be given only to organizations that showed "a decent respect for the contributions of western civilization, and United States history, ideas, and institutions, to the increase of freedom and prosperity around the world". Senator J. Bennett Johnston (D–LA) cast the only dissenting vote, apparently not because he supported the standards but because he wanted the resolution to be binding. The non-binding resolution was later removed from the Unfunded Mandates bill, and the issue was never discussed in the House of Representatives.

In response to the controversy, the Council for Basic Education assembled two panels of historians, history teachers, businesspeople, and politicians to analyze the National Standards. In October 1995, both panels concluded that the standards should be substantially revised but could still "provide a reasonable set of expectations for learning and a solid basis for strengthening history teaching". Former Assistant Secretary of Education Diane Ravitch, who had criticized the standards, said that the framework "can be fixed" and "should be fixed". The NCHS agreed to most of these changes. Ravitch and Pulitzer Prize-winning historian Arthur M. Schlesinger Jr., another critic of the original standards, then responded to Cheney with a Wall Street Journal editorial of their own in April 1996 which concluded that the NCHS had removed "every legitimate cause for complaint". Cheney maintained her criticism in a follow-up editorial entitled "New History Standards Still Attack Our Heritage".

While the National Standards were never adopted by any federal agency, the volumes were published and made available to educators across the country, and many school districts have used them in the development of their curricula. In 2000, Nash, Crabtree, and Dunn published a book about their experience of the controversy, History on Trial: Culture Wars and the Teaching of the Past.

== See also ==
- Culture war
