= Curriculum framework =

A curriculum framework is an organized plan or set of standards or learning outcomes that defines the content to be learned in terms of clear, definable standards of what the student should know and be able to do.

A curriculum framework is part of an outcome-based education or standards based education reform design. The framework is the second step, defining clear, high standards which will be achieved by all students. The curriculum is then aligned to the standards, and students are assessed against the standards. As compared with traditional education which is concerned only about delivering content, a standards based education reform system promises that all will succeed if all are held to high expectations. When the standards are reached, there will be no achievement gap where some groups are allowed to score lower than others, or the disabled are offered different opportunities than others. All will meet world class standards and be qualified for good colleges and trained for good jobs which pay good wages. In a traditional education system, the curriculum was defined by those who created textbooks rather than government bodies which assembled groups of stakeholders to create standards based on consensus of what students should know and be able to do.

In some states, curriculum frameworks have been adopted based on traditional academic standards rather than outcome-based constructivist standards, but many frameworks were originally or still based on student-centered learning and constructivism such as reform mathematics, whole language and Inquiry-based Science which have been controversial in some states and communities. High school graduation examinations tie awarding of diplomas to demonstration of meeting the standards set out in the frameworks.

== Global curriculum frameworks ==
- Project Management Curriculum and Resources Guidelines for Undergraduate Project Management Curricula and Resources was launched by a faculty steering committee in 2015. Funding to support the initiative was provided by Project Management Institute.

== National curriculum frameworks ==
- Australasian Curriculum Assessment and Certification Authorities (ACACA) ACACA is the national body for the chief executives of the statutory bodies in the Australian States and Territories and in New Zealand responsible for certificates of senior secondary education.
- The New Zealand Curriculum Framework is the official policy for teaching, learning, and assessment in New Zealand schools.
- NCERT is the official agency in India for deciding the curriculum framework for schools in India. During the year 2005 National Curriculum Framework (NCF 2005) the new policy was drafted.

== State curriculum frameworks ==
- Technical Education Frameworks
- Michigan Curriculum Framework
- Victorian Curriculum Assessment Authority: VELS
- California Content Standards & Curriculum Frameworks
- Virginia Dept. of Education, History and Social Science Standards
- Kerala State Council of Education Research and Training curriculum framework

== See also ==
- Standards based education reform
- Victorian Essential Learning Standards (VELS)
