= NCEE (disambiguation) =

The National Center on Education and the Economy is a US nonprofit organization.

NCEE may also refer to:

- National College Entrance Examination
- National Center for Education Evaluation, part of the Institute of Education Sciences
