= NEGP =

NEGP may refer to:

- National e-Governance Plan (NeGP), an Indian government initiative
- National Education Goals Panel, which was replaced by No Child Left Behind in 2002
- Nord Stream (disambiguation), North European Gas Pipeline
