= Institute for Political and Legal Education =

Educational organizations based in the United States

The Institute for Political and Legal Education is an educational program in which high school students are introduced to the American legislative and judicial process. For United States politics, students learn about the separation of powers, checks and balances, limits on the powers of the executive branch, and the role of the citizen in American society. In addition students learn how those ideas have evolved over the years.

To simulate the judicial process, students or groups of students are assigned civil court cases. Students then research the topic and develop a position which they write in a paper. The case is simulated in a moot court. Students are given a set amount of time to try to convince a mock judge to agree with their position through reasoning. The judge can then ask follow-up questions with which the students clarify their position and address concerns.

== See also ==
- Education in the United States
- Outcome-based education
