= Academic grading in South Africa =

In South Africa, the grading system used in High schools until 2008 (when the education minister implemented Outcomes Based Education or OBE curriculum) was as follows:

Format: Code [x] ([Symbol]): [y]% - [z]%

- Code 8 (A+);90% - 100%
- Code 7 (A): 80% - 100%
- Code 6 (B): 70% - 79%
- Code 5 (C): 60 %- 69%
- Code 4 (D): 50% - 59%
- Code 3 (E): 40% - 49%
- Code 2 (F): 30% - 39%
- Code 1 (G): 0% - 29%

The OBE system, when in its experimental stages, originally used a scale from 1 - 4 (a pass being a 3 and a '1st class pass' being above 70%), but this system was considered far too coarse and replaced by a scale from 1 to 7.

For the final standard exams, a 'normal pass' is given for an average mark 50%-59%, and a distinction is given for an average of 80% or more.

Most universities follow a model based on the British system. Thus, at the University of Cape Town and the University of South Africa (UNISA), the percentages are calibrated as follows: a 1st class pass is given for 75% and above, a second (division one) for 70 - 74%, a second (division two) for 60%-69%, and a third for 50 - 59%. Any lower than 40% is a fail. The University of the Witwatersrand considers an A to be 75% and above.

== Sources ==
- South African Education Department
- Stellenbosch University Grade Comparison (page 21)
- Cape Town University Academic Grading
