= School-to-work transition =

Preparation of school students for employment

School-to-work transition encompasses on-the-job training, apprenticeships, cooperative education agreements and other programs designed to prepare students to enter the job market. This education system is primarily employed in the United States, partially as a response to training as it is done in Asia.

School to Work is a system to introduce school-based, work-based, and connecting activities as early as kindergarten to prepare students for careers. School to Work emphasizes lifelong learning.

School to Work is funded and sponsored at the federal level by the U.S. Department of Labor and U.S. Department of Education. At the state level in states like Arizona, the grant is administered by the Arizona Department of Commerce, School to Work Division. This grant was funded for a maximum of five years with decreasing funds in years 3–5.

An example of county level involvement is the Cochise County STW Consortia in Arizona. It is composed of more than fifty Cochise County public and private schools, kindergarten through four-year university level, local and community-based organizations, and more than one hundred supporting business partners.

STW is part of a comprehensive education reform movement. It includes formulating standards that emphasize higher order thinking skills, new standards based assessments, and graduation exams, such as the Certificate of Initial Mastery. The goal is to insure that students are ready for job training or college prep by age 16.

== Critics ==
"Back to basics" traditionalists observe that in Europe, apprenticeships typically mean that the worker essentially ends their formal education after age 16, and works full-time at reduced pay in exchange for learning job skills such as assembling automobiles. Some believe that it was better to have students who were not bound for college concentrate on career skills, while academic students learn core academic subjects such as history or science. A student in North Dakota would have little opportunity to learn to be an auto designer, while one in Alabama would have little opportunity to do job shadowing at a software company if job training were allocated according to local human resource needs. Local businesses also need to structure their operations to accommodate student workers.

The Michigan STW Initiative states "students work without pay for two to three hours each day" and "students are able to perform what might otherwise be hazardous order work." which would contradict child labor laws. Data is shared with the state STW partnership network and local labor market areas, which might be an invasion of privacy. The state would utilize the national industry-recognized skill certificates when developed, which would be the Certificate of Initial Mastery. Critics call this a government-controlled passport to work.

== See also ==
- Career and Technical Education
- Outcome-based education
