= National Center for History in the Schools =

American K-12 history engagement group

The National Center for History in the Schools (NCHS) is an organization dedicated to enhancing teaching effectiveness and promoting K-12 student engagement with history through innovative publications, teaching aids, curricular development, professional workshops, and community outreach. The NCHS was founded in 1988 by UCLA Professor and Dean of Undergraduate and Intercollege Curricular Development Gary Nash. Today the NCHS is a division of the UCLA Department of History Public History Initiative and continues to support teachers and students in Los Angeles and across the United States through a range of publications available on the NCHS online catalog.

The NCHS's most notable projects included the development of the controversial 1994 National Standards for United States History, developed with federal funding to promote national educational reform with regard to the content and assessment of K–12 U.S. and world history courses in American schools, which were ultimately not adopted. The NCHS has continued to develop materials for U.S. and world history including the Bring History Alive! series and The Big Eras: A Compact History of Humankind for Teachers and Students edited by Ross E. Dunn, professor and co-director of World History for Us All. In addition, the NCHS has published over 70 teaching units in U.S. and world history that draw on historical primary sources and link lessons to National History Standards.

The NCHS is part of a dynamic network of university-based programs that partner with school districts and K-12 teachers to develop innovative teaching units. NCHS programming has been funded by agencies such as the United States Department of Education, the National Endowment for the Humanities, the University of California President’s Office, the Ahmanson Foundation, the Longview Foundation, the Sidney Stern Foundation, and other private foundations. NCHS has been a partner on five Department of Education Teaching American History grants, providing for the academic presentations around which school districts organize their professional development.

== Sources ==
- History Teacher Forum April 1991
- National Standards for World History
- History on Trial: Culture Wars and the Teaching of the Past
- The End of History Wall Street Journal
- National Standards in American Education: A Citizen's Guide Google Books page xvii
