= Gary B. Nash =

American historian (1933–2021)

Gary Baring Nash (July 27, 1933 – July 29, 2021) was an American historian. He concentrated on the Revolutionary period, slavery and race, as well as the formation of political communities in Philadelphia and other cities.

== Life and education ==
Nash was born in Merion, Pennsylvania, a Philadelphia suburb. After graduating from Lower Merion High School, he attended Princeton University, where he earned his undergraduate and doctoral degrees (BA 1955, PhD 1964). From 1955-58, he served in the U.S. Navy on the John W. Weeks (DD-701), where he was antisubmarine officer and then gunnery officer.

Nash was married for 40 years to Cynthia J. Shelton, a former graduate student of his. He had four children with his first wife, Chris Workum Nash, and nine grandchildren. He died of colon cancer July 29, 2021.

== Academic career ==
After serving as Assistant to the Dean of the Graduate School (1959–62) and completing his doctoral degree, he joined the faculty of Princeton as an instructor in 1964 and an assistant professor in 1965-66. He moved to the University of California, Los Angeles (UCLA), where he was an assistant professor, 1966–68; associate professor, 1969–72, and full professor from 1972 to 1994. He was Dean of the Council for Educational Development from 1980 to 1984 and Dean of Undergraduate and Intercollege Curricular Development at UCLA from 1984 to 1991.

== Historical arguments ==
Nash was prominent in emphasizing the importance of marginalized groups in helping shape American history, especially the poor, the working-class, African-Americans, and Native Americans. His studies of the American Revolution emphasize the roles of seamen, tenant farmers, city artisans, slaves, Native Americans, and women. Historian Edmund Morgan has challenged Nash, arguing that the movements Nash emphasizes were "disparate, local, and mostly unsuccessful". Morgan says that the main impetus for independence came from the elites in the Continental Congress.

== History profession ==
Nash co-directed the development of the National History Standards in U.S. and World History from 1992–94, when they were published by the National Center for History in the Schools (NCHS), where he served as Associate Director from 1988–94. He became the Director of NCHS in 1994 and oversaw the revision of the National History Standards published in 1996.

Nash served as president of the Organization of American Historians in 1994–95 and was on the OAH Executive Board from 1988 to 1991, and 1992 to 1998. He was an elected member of the American Academy of Arts and Sciences, the American Antiquarian Society, the American Philosophical Society, and the Society of American Historians. He has served on the History Advisory Council of the College Board (2005–08), the Executive Board of the National Council for History Education (1990–2004), the Advisory Committee of the Skirball Institute on American Values (1988–2003), the National Advisory Council of the Historical Society of Pennsylvania since 2004. In 2008–09, he served as a member of the Second Century National Park Service Commission.

== Works ==
In addition to the many books he authored, co-authored, or co–edited, Nash made chapter contributions to more than thirty books and published forty-five articles and over eighty book reviews, op–ed essays, and comments. His article "Poverty and Poor Relief in PreRevolutionary Philadelphia" (William and Mary Quarterly, Jan. 1976) won the Daughters of Colonial Wars' prize for the journal's best article for 1976.

=== As author ===
- Quakers and Politics: Pennsylvania, 1681–1726 (1968)
- Class and Society in Early America (1970)
- Red, White, and Black: The Peoples of Early America (1974)
- The Private Side of American History: Readings in Everyday Life (1975)
- The Urban Crucible: Social Change, Political Consciousness and the Origins of the American Revolution (1979)
- Race, Class and Politics: Essays on American Colonial and Revolutionary Society (1986)
- Forging Freedom: The Formation of Philadelphia's Black Community, 1720–1840 (1988)
- Race and Revolution: The Inaugural Merrill Jensen Lectures (1990)
- American Odyssey: The United States in the Twentieth Century (1991)
- Forbidden Love: The Hidden History of Mixed-Race America (1999; 2010)
- First City: Philadelphia and the Forging of Historical Memory (2001)
- The Unknown American Revolution: The Unruly Birth of Democracy and the Struggle to Create America (2005)
- The Forgotten Fifth: African Americans in the Age of Revolution (2006)
- Friends of Liberty: Thomas Jefferson, Tadeusz Kosciuszko, and Agrippa Hull (2008)

=== As co-author ===
- The American People: Creating a Nation and a Society (1986)
- Retracing the Past: Readings in the History of the American People (1986) (2 volumes)
- Freedom by Degrees: Emancipation and Its Aftermath in Pennsylvania, 1690–1840 (1991)
- History on Trial: National Identity, Culture Wars, and the Teaching of the Past (1997)
- with Graham Russell Gao Hodges, Friends of Liberty: A Tale of Three Patriots, Two Revolutions, and A Tragic Betrayal of Freedom in the New Nation (2008)

=== As co-editor ===
- The Great Fear: Race in The Mind of America (1970)
- Struggle and Survival in Colonial America (1981)
- Lessons From History: Essential Understandings and Historical Perspectives Students Should Acquire (1992)
- Empire, Society, and Labor: Essays in Honor of Richard S. Dunn (1997)

== Quotes ==
[Teachers] know you’re not going to have a very interesting, productive and useful history class if you exclude anything which would make any child uncomfortable or that would lead to any division of opinion.
