= PLATO WA =

People Lobbying Against Teaching Outcomes
- Abbreviation: PLATO
- Formation: 14 June 2004
- Dissolved: 26 April 2009 (dormant)
- Type: Community lobby group
- Location: Western Australia
- Key people: Marko Vojkovic, Steve Kessell
- Website: platowa.com (defunct)

PLATO WA, an abbreviation of 'People Lobbying Against Teaching Outcomes', was a lobby group led by Marko Vojkovic that was at the forefront of an ultimately successful campaign of parents and teachers against the implementation of Outcomes Based Education in Western Australia. After launching, the PLATO WA website quickly became one of the most widely read educational websites in Australia with more 180,000 hits per month and contained an archive of more than 10,000 articles on the subject of OBE implementation. The role of PLATO in leading public opinion against OBE was acknowledged in many academic papers on the subject.

== Background ==
Outcomes Based Education was an education philosophy that influenced national and state educational policies from the early 1990s. Western Australia’s experience commenced with the development of the 1999 Curriculum Framework which became mandatory for all schools in the state.

PLATO was formed on 14 June 2004 by high school science teacher Marko Vojkovic in response to the increased efforts of the state government to implement an Outcomes Based Education system in schools. In May 2006 retired Professor Steve Kessell stated that the teachers who opposed OBE where not a handful of troublemakers, but the overwhelming majority. On 14 June 2006 they were involved in an anti-OBE rally at Parliament House.

The push to introduce outcomes based assessment in place of conventional examinations led to significant community opposition, supported by The West Australian, and became a major political issue for the Carpenter ministry.

Education Minister Ljiljanna Ravlich was a particular target of PLATO. Following her demotion in 2006, Western Australia's OBE curriculum was subjected to parliamentary inquiry. In 2008 it was officially abandoned by the state government with Minister for Education Mark McGowan remarking that the 1990s fad "to dispense with syllabus" was over. That same year PLATO supported the approach of the proposed Australian National Curriculum.

PLATO WA inspired a similar lobby group in Queensland called PLATO QLD.
