= David P. Gardner =

American academic administrator (1933–2024)

15th President of the University of California
- In office 1983–1992
- Preceded by: David S. Saxon
- Succeeded by: Jack W. Peltason

10th President of the University of Utah
- In office 1973–1983
- Preceded by: Alfred C. Emery
- Succeeded by: Chase N. Peterson

Personal details
- Born: David Pierpont Gardner; March 24, 1933 Berkeley, California, U.S.
- Died: January 2, 2024 (aged 90) Park City, Utah, U.S.
- Spouses: Elizabeth Fuhriman (m. 1958; died 1991); Sheila S. Rogers (m. 1995)
- Children: 4
- Education: Brigham Young University; University of California, Berkeley
- Profession: University administrator, professor

Academic work
- Discipline: Education
- Institutions: University of California, Santa Barbara; University of Utah

David Pierpont Gardner (March 24, 1933 – January 2, 2024) was an American academic administrator. He served as the 15th president of the University of California system from 1983 to 1992 and as the 10th president of the University of Utah from 1973 to 1983.

== Biography ==
David Pierpont Gardner was born in Berkeley, California, on March 24, 1933, to Reed S. Gardner and Margaret Pierpont Gardner. He married Elizabeth (Libby) Fuhriman in 1958. They had four daughters (Karen, Shari, Lisa, and Marci) before Libby's death in 1991. He married Sheila S. Rogers in 1995.

Gardner was an active member of the Church of Jesus Christ of Latter-day Saints (LDS Church) and contributed to the Encyclopedia of Mormonism.

Gardner's bachelor's degree in political science, history, and geography was earned at Brigham Young University in 1955. He went on to the University of California, Berkeley, to obtain an MA in political science in 1959 and a PhD in higher education in 1966.

Gardner was appointed Assistant to the Chancellor at University of California, Santa Barbara, (UCSB) before completing his PhD, and accepted a joint appointment as Assistant Chancellor and Professor of Higher Education at UCSB in 1967. He moved to UC Berkeley as the Vice President for Public Service Programs and University Dean of University Extension for UC Berkeley in 1971, then became the Vice President for Extended Academic and Public Service Programs in the Office of the President (UC system wide) in 1972.

Gardner left the University of California to become the president of the University of Utah in 1973.

Gardner stayed there until he returned to the University of California in 1983 as President. His wife Libby was named Associate to the President, and he worked with her closely. He resigned after her death in 1991 (effective in 1992), stating that he could not continue without her. He was given a controversial retirement package worth nearly $2.4 million.

In 1983, Gardner was elected a fellow of the National Academy of Public Administration. Gardner was then later elected to the American Academy of Arts and Sciences in 1986 and the American Philosophical Society in 1989. He served as President of the William and Flora Hewlett Foundation from 1993 to 1999. He became a professor of educational leadership and policy in the Graduate School of Education at the University of Utah in 2001. He was also the chair of National Commission on Excellence in Education, whose members wrote the well-known educational document, A Nation at Risk.

Gardner died in Park City, Utah on January 2, 2024, at the age of 90.

Academic offices
Preceded by David S. Saxon	President of the University of California; 1983–1992	Succeeded by Jack W. Peltason
Preceded by Alfred C. Emery	President of the University of Utah; 1973–1983	Succeeded by Chase N. Peterson
