= Alfred C. Emery =

American law professor and academic administrator

9th President of the University of Utah
- In office 1971–1973
- Preceded by: James C. Fletcher
- Succeeded by: David P. Gardner

Personal details
- Born: January 24, 1919 Salt Lake City, Utah
- Died: March 18, 2002 (aged 83) Salt Lake City, Utah

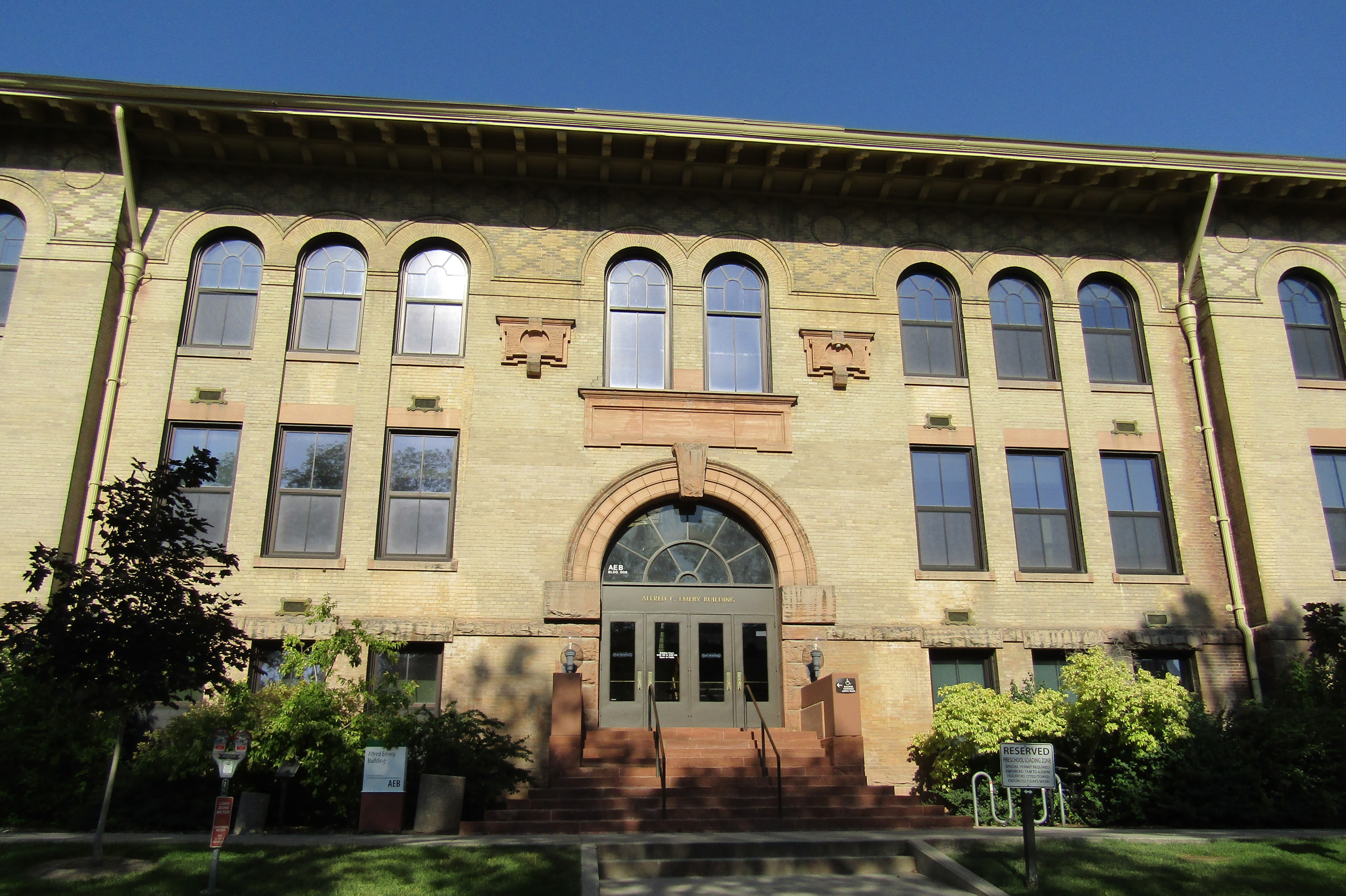
Alfred C. Emery building at the University of Utah

Alfred Charles Emery (January 24, 1919 - March 18, 2002) was an American law professor and academic administrator. He served as the president of the University of Utah from 1971 to 1973.
