= Terrel Bell =

American governmental official

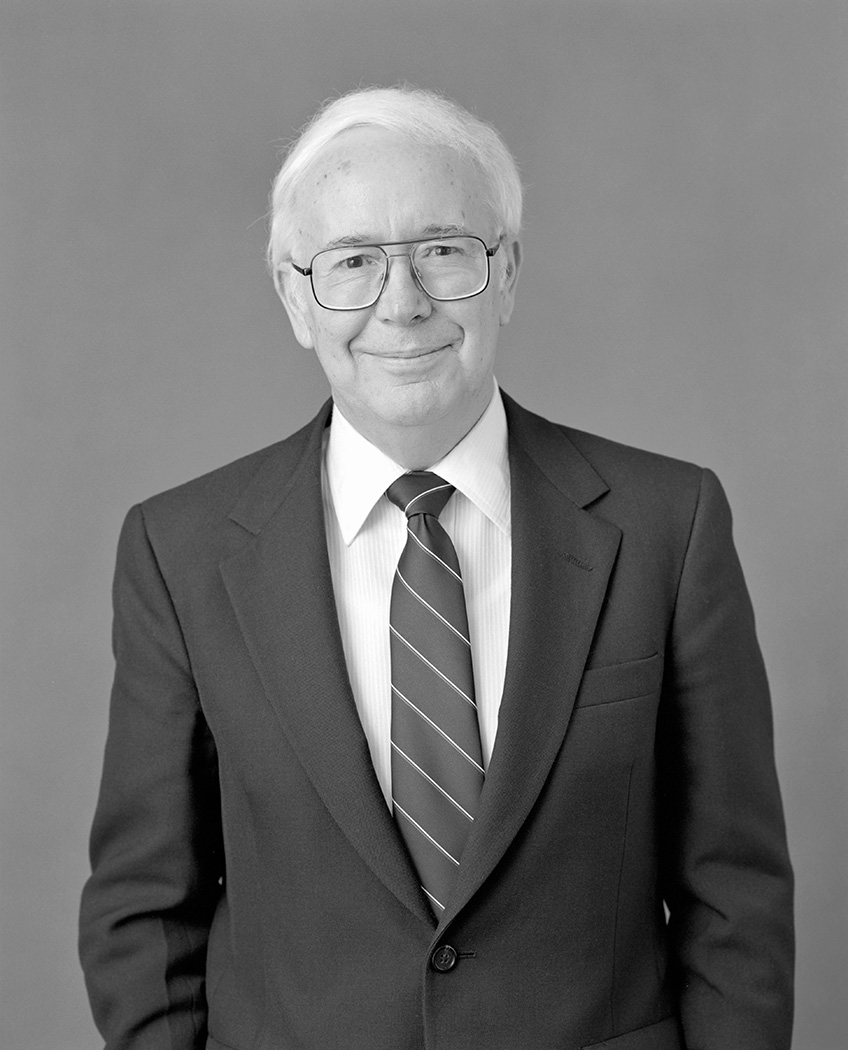
- Official portrait, 1983

2nd United States Secretary of Education
- In office January 22, 1981 – December 31, 1984
- President: Ronald Reagan
- Preceded by: Shirley Hufstedler
- Succeeded by: William Bennett

United States Commissioner of Education
- In office June 1974 – August 1, 1976
- President: Richard Nixon; Gerald Ford
- Preceded by: John Ottina
- Succeeded by: Edward Aguirre

Personal details
- Born: Terrel Howard Bell; November 11, 1921 Lava Hot Springs, Idaho, U.S.
- Died: June 22, 1996 (aged 74) Salt Lake City, Utah, U.S.
- Party: Republican
- Spouse: Betty Fitzgerald
- Children: 4 sons
- Education: Albion State Normal School (BA); University of Idaho (MA); University of Utah (PhD)

Military service
- Allegiance: United States
- Branch/service: U.S. Marine Corps
- Rank: Sergeant
- Battles/wars: World War II

Terrel Howard Bell (November 11, 1921 – June 22, 1996) was the secretary of education in the cabinet of President Ronald Reagan. He was the second secretary of education, following Shirley Hufstedler.

== Early life and career ==
Bell was born in Lava Hot Springs, Idaho, on November 11, 1921; at age eight, his father died. Bell graduated from Lava Hot Springs High School in 1940, and the Albion State Normal School in 1946. After this he served as a school superintendent of various schools in Idaho and Wyoming. He was the superintendent of schools in Rockland, Idaho.

Bell spent much of his professional career in Utah. He served as a sergeant in the Marine Corps during World War II and returned to Idaho to get his education. After earning a B.A. in Albion in 1946, Bell started a career as a high school teacher and bus driver.

He earned an MA from the University of Idaho in Moscow in 1954, and a PhD in education from the University of Utah in Salt Lake City in 1961. Bell also served as Utah's Commissioner of Higher Education and the superintendent of Weber School District in Utah from 1958 to 1962. He taught at Utah State University beginning in 1962, becoming head of the Department of Educational Administration.

== National Commissioner of Education ==
Bell served as the United States commissioner of education (prior to the creation of the cabinet position) under Presidents Richard Nixon and Gerald Ford from 1974 to 1976.

== U.S. Secretary of Education ==
Appointed to the Reagan cabinet in 1981, Bell was expected to preside over the dismantling of the Department of Education, but he ran into the legal requirement that such a dismantling required legislation. He was well-known, admired, and respected in education circles, having risen from high school teacher through college professor to administrative positions. Bell stood out as a humble man in an administration of moneyed people—he drove a U-Haul truck from Utah to Washington when he moved, as political appointees did not get reimbursed for moving expenses.

In 1981, Bell convinced Reagan to appoint a commission to study excellence in education. The 1983 report of the National Commission on Excellence in Education, titled A Nation at Risk, started the drive for education reform with its conclusions, which included the claim that the nation was threatened by "a rising tide of mediocrity."

During his tenure, the issue of asbestos in public schools was a major topic of concern.

== Resignation and later life ==
Though education's importance was highlighted by the reform drive, Reagan continued to try to reduce funding at the Department of Education. Bell served for Reagan's first term, resigning effective December 31, 1984. Bell was succeeded by Bill Bennett and returned to Salt Lake City to join the faculty at the University of Utah. In 1988, he published his memoir entitled The Thirteenth Man: A Reagan Cabinet Memoir.

Bell published seven other books during his career, covering topics such as improving child intellectual development and reforming the educational process. His last book in 1993, written with his business partner Dr. Donna Elmquist at his nonprofit company T.H. Bell and Associates in Salt Lake City, made new recommendations for improving the U.S. education system. He believed that, "there are three things to emphasize in teaching: The first is motivation, the second is motivation, and the third is (you guessed it) motivation."

Bell was inducted into Idaho's Hall of Fame in 1987.

== Personal ==
Bell married Josephine Samuels in 1950. Their son, Jon, died in infancy. Bell divorced Josephine in 1956. He married his second wife, Betty Ruth Fitzgerald in 1957, and they had four sons: Mark F., Warren T., Glenn M., and Peter F. Bell.

== Death ==
Bell died in his sleep at age 74 of pulmonary fibrosis at his home in Salt Lake City in 1996; he is interred in Larkin Sunset Gardens in Sandy, Utah.

== Terrel H. Bell Award ==
The Department of Education gives an award named after Bell to recognize "outstanding school leaders and the vital role they play in overcoming challenging circumstances." On November 3, 2009, the award was given to eight U.S. public school principals. Concurrent with the award, the department issued a press release which stated, "The late Secretary Terrel H. Bell held education as his highest priority, trusting that all students would find it their personal key to success as he had."

== See also ==
- National Blue Ribbon Schools Program

Political offices
Preceded by John Ottina	United States Commissioner of Education; 1974–1976	Succeeded by Edward Aguirre
Preceded by Shirley Hufstedler	United States Secretary of Education; 1981–1985	Succeeded by Bill Bennett
