= Certificate of Initial Mastery =

The Certificate of Mastery (CIM) was created by report "America's Choice: High Skills or Low Wages". The CIM has been called an outcome-based education diploma as it would be necessary to either receive or replace the high school diploma, and was characteristic of education reform legislation in many states such as Washington and Oregon.

The report called for the nation's workforce for the challenges of a new world economic order. The Report of the Commission on the Skills of the American Workforce was published in June 1990 by the National Center on Education and the Economy (NCEE), led by Marc Tucker. This document was the basis for the education reform laws, standards and assessment systems created by many states and the federal government in the 1990s in the United States. It codified the principles of outcomes-based education reform, which later became standards-based education reform.

== Recommendations ==
From the report:

A new educational performance standard should be set for all students, to be met by age sixteen. This standard should be established nationally and benchmarked to the highest in the world. Students passing a series of performance- based assessments that incorporate the standard would be awarded a Certificate of Initial Mastery. This certificate would qualify the student to choose among going to work, entering a college preparatory program, or studying for a Technical and Professional Certificate, which would be explicitly tied to advanced job requirements. These standards would not be intended as sorting mechanisms, but would allow multiple opportunities for success; the goal would simply be to ensure achievement of high performance standards for the great majority of the nation's workforce.

== Legacy ==
The NCEE eventually signed contracts with districts and states covering over half of public school children, including WASL and MCAS.

== Abandonment ==
The formal terms and contractual agreements have been abandoned as no states or districts are still contracted to the NCEE, and legislation in states such as Washington have discarded the term "Certificate of Initial Mastery" or its minor variations.

They have been effectively replaced by the No Child Left Behind, and tying the high school diploma to standards based test inspired by outcome-based education. Passing a test at the age of 16 was patterned after the European practice of ending the education of the non-college bound at 16 followed by an apprenticeship period, and this is why all states are using tests given at the 10th grade, even though US high schools don't graduate until the end of 12th grade.

== The New Commission on the Skills of the American Workforce ==
The NCEE published a new study in December 2006, also co-authored by Marc Tucker which is essentially an updated version of the America's Choice report. The term "Certificate of Initial Mastery" is abandoned, but the report "Tough Choices or Tough Times" still advocates a test given at age 16 which would end high school education, followed by enrollment in community college or university prep courses.

== See also ==
- Norma Paulus, the Oregon Superintendent of Public Instruction who introduced the CIM in that state
- Susan Castillo, the Oregon Superintendent when the system was abolished in that state
