= Marc Tucker =

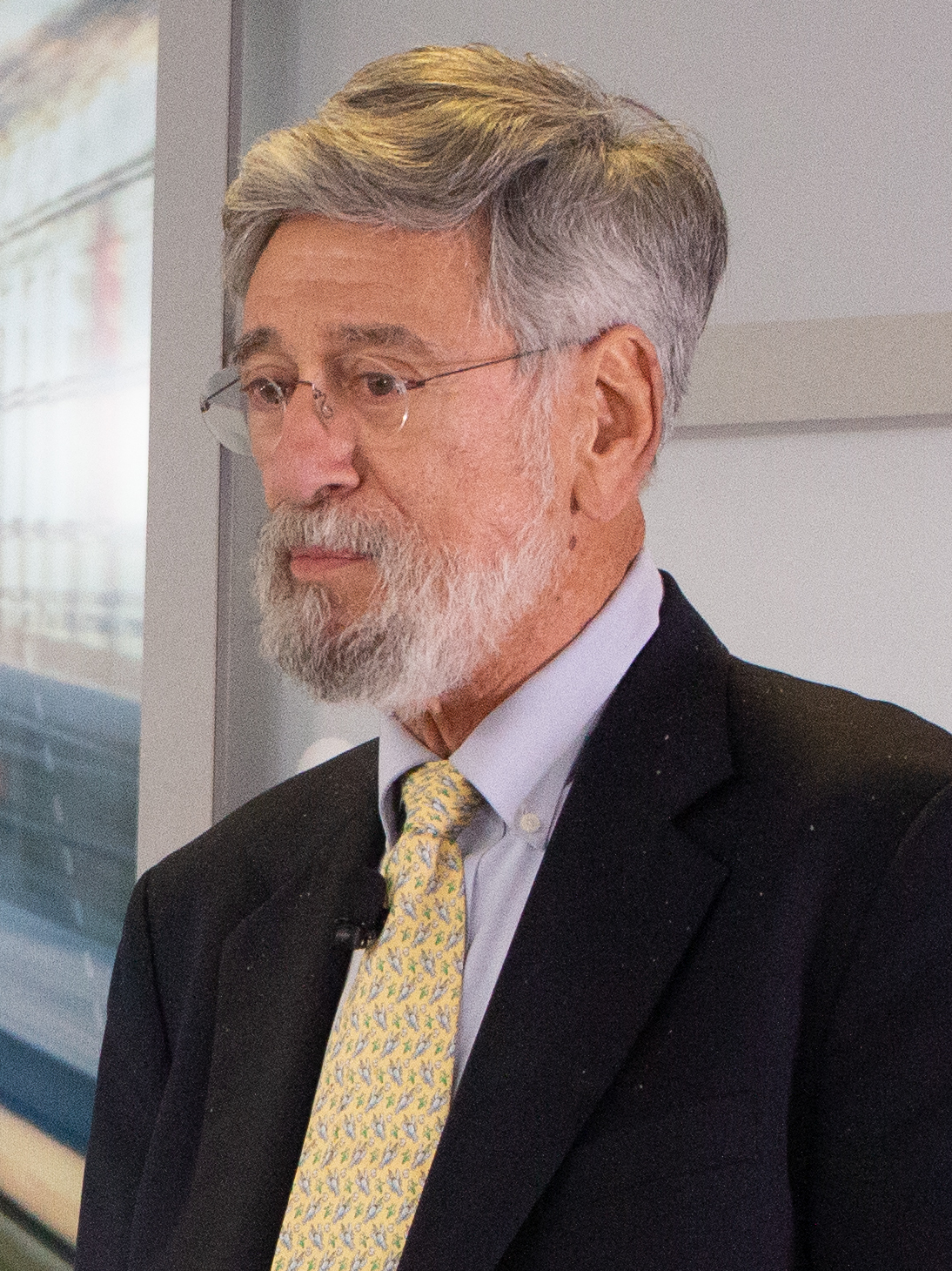
Tucker in 2019

Marc S. Tucker (born 1939) was the president and CEO of the National Center on Education and the Economy from 1988 until January 1, 2019.

== Education and career ==
Tucker is a graduate of Brown University.

He was president and chief executive officer of the National Center on Education and the Economy, the associate director of the National Institute of Education. He was appointed professor of education at the University of Rochester and was appointed by president Bill Clinton to the National Skills Standards Board, where he served as the chair of its research and policy committee.

== Publications ==
Tucker is the author or editor of:

- A Nation Prepared: Teachers for the 21st Century (Carnegie Forum on Education and the Economy, 1986)
- America's Choice: High Skills or Low Wages (National Center on Education and the Economy, 1990)
- Thinking for a Living: Education and the Wealth of Nations (with Ray Marshall, Basic Books, 1992)
- Standards for Our Schools: How to Set Them, Measure Them, and Reach Them (with Judy Codding, Jossey-Bass, 1998)
- The Principal Challenge: Leading and Managing Schools in an Era of Accountability (edited with Judy Codding, Jossey-Bass, 2002)
- Tough Choices or Tough Times: The Report of the New Commission on the Skills of the American Workforce (National Center on Education and the Economy, 2006)
- Surpassing Shanghai: An Agenda for American Education Built on the World's Leading Systems (edited with Linda Darling-Hammond, Harvard Education Press, 2011)
