= National Commission on Excellence in Education =

Education reform (1981–83)

The National Commission on Excellence in Education was an agency of the United States Department of Education, established in 1981 by Secretary of Education Terrel Bell. The Commission's two years of work resulted in the report A Nation at Risk: The Imperative for Educational Reform. It was chaired by David P. Gardner and included prominent members such as Nobel prize-winning chemist Glenn T. Seaborg.

It produced a short summary of its findings called The United States System of Education in which it gives a short history of education since colonial days and, after a Preface, gives an overall view on control and financing of education, organization and structure, statistical data and conclusions.

== Background ==
In their 1983 report, A nation at risk: The imperative for educational reform, the National Commission on Excellence in Education said "Our Nation is at risk. Our once unchallenged preeminence in commerce, industry, science, and technological innovation is being overtaken by competitors throughout the world."

In 1983, The New York Times published an article that cited a passage from the "Pursuit of Excellence: Education and the Future of America" by the Rockefeller Brothers' Fund's panel, "America at Mid-Century."

The "excellence" movement of the mid-1980s, was inspired by the report, A Nation at Risk.

The article emphasized multiple key points, among them being that teachers have been frequently regarded as identical units of a factory assembly line in the education sector. Mentors regardless of competence teach the same subjects in the same grade, use one kind of textbook, deal with the same number of pupils, and receive equal salaries. This trend has not changed since 1958. The late John W. Gardner who used to be Education Secretary of former President Lyndon Johnson and afterwards Chairman of the Commission insisted that students with academic proficiency should take an additional three years each of mathematics, science, and one foreign language which did not happen.

The 36-page Nation at Risk Report criticized the state of schools in the United States and clamored for numerous reforms to rectify supposed flaws in the country's public education system at that time. The commentary described education in America as mediocre. There were few indications of assurance because of test scores that were declining at a rapid pace, low salaries of teachers, and substandard training programs for educators. The turnover rate of teachers became alarmingly high. Statistics showed that some 23 million American adults did not have sufficient reading and writing skills. This report gained plenty of attention from media.
