= Ready schools =

Type of pre-kindergarten school

Ready schools are schools that help prepare younger kids for kindergarten. The concept of ready schools is part of the larger school readiness movement.

== Methods ==
Ready schools are based on aligning early childhood and elementary education to strengthen child outcomes, and institutional characteristics. Schools that are ready are committed to every child's success, contacts parents early about school registration, communicate with childcare staff, have a variety of hands-on learning, retain instructional materials, promote community, provide accurate information about cultural experiences, and assess the quality of their own classrooms. Ready schools failing to meet such factors are supposed to assess its their weaknesses and build on its strengths.
