= National Council for History Education =

The National Council for History Education (NCHE) is a United States-based non-profit advocacy group that promotes the importance of history.

== Overview ==
The National Council for History Education was incorporated in 1990 as a successor to the Bradley Commission on History in Schools. The core purpose of this organization is to lead in the teaching and learning of history. One of the ways that NCHE sets out to accomplish this is to provide a communications network for all advocates of history education. These advocates include but are not limited to; schools, colleges, museums, historical councils, and community groups. NCHE is funded by a diverse membership composed of history enthusiasts and educators alike who are dedicated to bridging the divide between classroom teachers and those in the collegiate academic world as well as advocacy of the importance of strong history education in all walks of life. Further funding is provided by partnerships and grants through both the federal government's Teaching American History grant program as well as private grants such as those received by the Mellon Foundation.

== See also ==
European Association of History Educators
