= Goals 2000 =

Education reform in the United States

The National Educational Goals, also known as the Goals 2000 Act were set by the U.S. Congress in the 1990s to set goals for standards-based education reform. The intent was for certain criteria to be met by the millennium (2000). Many of these goals were based on the principles of outcomes-based education, and not all of the goals were attained by the year 2000 as intended. Many see this as the predecessor to the No Child Left Behind program, which mandated measurable improvement in student achievement across all groups. Goals 2000 established a framework in which to identify world-class academic standards, to measure student progress, and to provide the support that students may need to help meet the standards.

== Goals ==
The goals stated in the Summary of Goals 2000 include:

By the Year 2000...

- All children in America will start school ready to learn.
- The high school graduation rate will increase to at least 90 percent.
- All students will leave grades 4, 8, and 12 having demonstrated competency over challenging subject matter including English, mathematics, science, foreign languages, civics and government, economics, the arts, history, and geography, and every school in America will ensure that all students learn to use their minds well, so they may be prepared for responsible citizenship, further learning, and productive employment in our nation's modern economy.
- United States students will be first in the world in mathematics and science achievement.
- Every adult American will be literate and will possess the knowledge and skills necessary to compete in a global economy and exercise the rights and responsibilities of citizenship.
- Every school in the United States will be free of drugs, violence, and the unauthorized presence of firearms and alcohol and will offer a disciplined environment conducive to learning.
- The nation's teaching force will have access to programs for the continued improvement of their professional skills and the opportunity to acquire the knowledge and skills needed to instruct and prepare all American students for the next century.
- Every school will promote partnerships that will increase parental involvement and participation in promoting the social, emotional, and academic growth of children.

== History ==
"The Goals 2000: Educate America Act (P.L. 103-227)" was signed into law on March 31, 1994 by President Bill Clinton. The Act provides resources to states and communities to ensure that all students reach their full potential.

It is based on the premise of outcomes-based education that students will reach higher levels of achievement when more is expected of them. Congress appropriated $105 million for fiscal year 1994. States submitted applications to develop school improvement plans, and make subgrants to local schools, and awards for pre-service and professional development.

In 1996, President Clinton introduced a competitive grant entitled the Technology Literacy Challenge Fund (TLCF). The president allocated 2 million dollars to ensure that every child in every school utilize technology to achieve high standards by the dawn of the 21st century. The president urged a variety of stakeholders from the private sector, schools, teachers, students, community groups, state and local governors and the federal government to work in a partnership toward achieving high levels of technology in schools.

In a 1996 letter to school Chief Operating Officers, President Clinton urged states and local school districts to work together in achieving the following four goals:

1. All teachers will have the training and support they need to help all students learn through computers the information superhighway
2. All teachers and students will have modern computers in their classrooms
3. Every classroom will be connected to the information superhighway
4. Effective and engaging software and on-line resources will be an integral part of every school curriculum

The overarching problem behind ensuring that every child in every school utilize an equal level of technology is the TLCF was a competitive grant. The issue with the competitive grant notion is that not all schools and therefore children could receive equal levels of technological assistance.

== National Standards for Arts Education ==
With the passage of Goals 2000, the first National Standards for Arts Education were created. There are content standards for dance, theater, music, and the visual arts. Every content standard is followed by several achievement standards describing how students are to demonstrate mastery of the content standards. The goals are not intended to be a curriculum. Instead, curriculum is to be developed locally on the basis of the goals. Standards are grouped in four divisions—creation and performance; cultural and historical context; perception and analysis; and the nature and value of the arts.

The Music Content Standards for each level are as follows:

1. Singing, alone and with others, a varied repertoire of music
2. Playing instruments, alone and with others, a varied repertoire of music
3. Improvising melodies, variations, and accompaniments
4. Composing and arranging music within specified guidelines
5. Reading and notating music
6. Listening to, analyzing, and describing music
7. Evaluating music and music performance
8. Understanding relationships between music, the other arts, and disciplines outside the arts
9. Understanding music in relation to history and culture

== End of Goals 2000 ==
With the final language of President George Bush's 2001 No Child Left Behind Act (H.R. 1) came the withdrawal of all authorization for Goals 2000. However, even though Congress had withdrawn its authorization for Goals 2000, if funding was not also withdrawn, the crippled, but alive Goals 2000 program would stagger on. Then, just before leaving town on December 21, 2001, Congress passed the Fiscal Year 2002 Education Appropriations Conference Committee report which eliminated spending on Goals 2000. Goals 2000 was no longer authorized or funded.

Additionally, in an article by Kenneth J. Cooper from The Washington Post dated December 3, 1999, he stated the following:

"The nation has not met any of the eight educational goals for the year 2000 set a decade ago by President Bush and the governors of all 50 states, although measurable progress has been made toward the goals pertaining to preschoolers and student achievement in math and reading, a national panel announced yesterday.

The National Education Goals Panel’s final report before the 2000 deadline showed that more children were 'ready to learn'—healthier and better prepared through preschool or parental reading—when they entered kindergarten. Students also demonstrated higher math proficiency, particularly in elementary and middle school, and a slight improvement in reading proficiency in middle school."

In the case of two goals, teacher quality and school safety, the panel reported the nation has actually gone backward. The percentage of teachers holding a college degree in the main subject they teach dropped from 66 percent to 63 percent, and there was a significant increase in student use of illicit drugs, from 24 percent to 37 percent in 10th grade.

== See also ==
- National Education Goals Panel
- Ready schools
