= A Nation at Risk =

1983 report on U.S. education

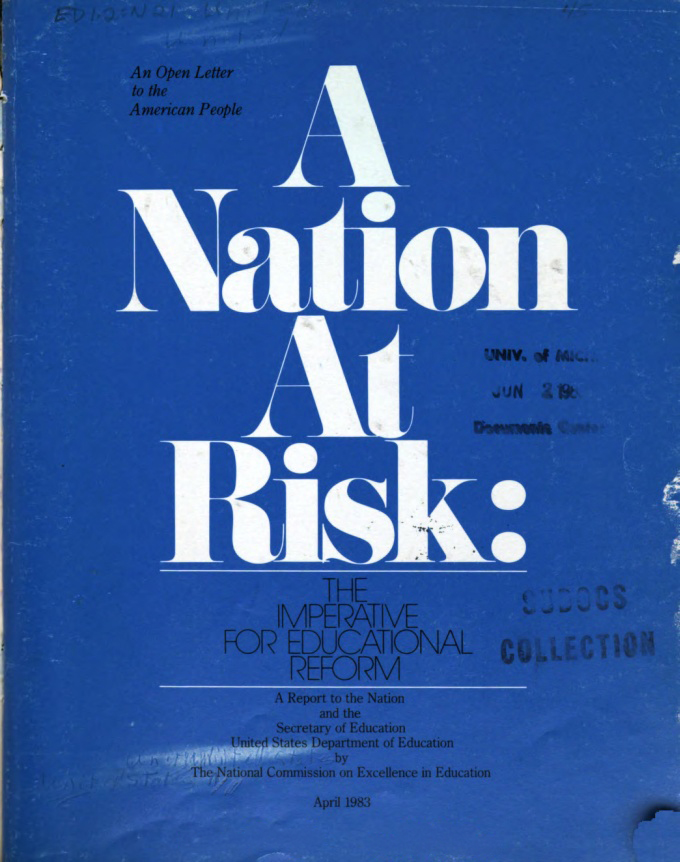
- Published: 1983
- Publisher: National Commission on Excellence in Education

A Nation at Risk: The Imperative for Educational Reform is the 1983 report of the United States National Commission on Excellence in Education.

== Formation and motivation ==
The commission consisted of 18 members, drawn from the private sector, government, and education. The chair of the commission was David Pierpont Gardner. Secretary of Education Terrel Bell sought to have the president appoint the commission, but Reagan disagreed, so it was Bell who established the commission and appointed its members.

As implied by the title of the report, the commission's charter responds to Terrel Bell's claim that the United States' educational system was failing to meet the national need for a competitive workforce. Yvonne Larsen, vice-chairman of the commission, and Gerald Holton, a member, have both stated that they were trying to confirm concerns they already had, rather than complete an objective analysis of the state of schools. Among other things, the charter required the commission to assess the "quality of teaching and learning" at the primary, secondary, and post-secondary levels, in both the public and private spheres and to compare "American schools and colleges with those of other advanced nations." The report was primarily authored by James J. Harvey, who synthesized the feedback from the commission members. Harvey wrote, "the educational foundations of our society are presently being eroded by a rising tide of mediocrity that threatens our very future as a Nation and a People... If an unfriendly foreign power had attempted to impose on America the mediocre educational performance that exists today, we might well have viewed it as an act of war."

Presidential commissions on education have been relatively common since the Truman Report in 1947. Other notable groups include Dwight Eisenhower's "Committee on Education Beyond the High School" in 1956, John F. Kennedy's Task Force on Education in 1960, and George W. Bush's Commission on the Future of Higher Education, also known as the Spellings Commission, which produced "A Test of Leadership" in 2006.

== Content ==
The report surveys various studies which point to academic underachievement on national and international scales. The report said that average SAT scores dropped "over 50 points" in the verbal section and "nearly 40 points" in the mathematics section, during the period 1963-1980. Nearly forty percent of 17-year-olds tested could not successfully "draw inferences from written material," and "only one-fifth can write a persuasive essay; and only one-third can solve a mathematics problem requiring several steps." Referencing tests conducted in the 1970s, the study points to unfavorable comparisons with students outside the United States: on "19 academic tests American students were never first or second and, in comparison with other industrialized nations, were last seven times".

In response to these and similar problems, the commission made 38 recommendations, divided across 5 major categories: Content, Standards and Expectations, Time, Teaching, Leadership and Fiscal Support:

- Content: "(a) 4 years of English; (b) 3 years of mathematics; (c) 3 years of science; (d) 3 years of social studies; and (e) one-half year of computer science" for high school students." The commission also recommends that students work toward proficiency in a foreign language starting in the elementary grades.
- Standards and Expectations: the commission cautioned against grade inflation and recommends that four-year colleges raise admissions standards and standardized tests of achievement at "major transition points from one level of schooling to another and particularly from high school to college or work."
- Time: the commission recommended that "school districts and State legislatures should strongly consider 7-hour school days, as well as a 200- to 220-day school year."
- Teaching: the commission recommended that salaries for teachers be "professionally competitive, market-sensitive, and performance-based," and that teachers demonstrate "competence in an academic discipline."
- Leadership and Fiscal Support: the commission noted that the Federal government plays an essential role in helping "meet the needs of key groups of students such as the gifted and talented, the socioeconomically disadvantaged, minority and language minority students, and the handicapped." The commission also noted that the Federal government must help ensure compliance with "constitutional and civil rights," "provide students with financial assistance and research graduate training."

== Critique ==
In 1990, the Secretary of Energy, James Watkins, commissioned the Sandia Laboratories in New Mexico to document the educational performance decline presented in the Nation at Risk report with actual data. When the systems scientists broke down the SAT test scores into subgroups, they discovered contradictory data. Whereas the overall average scores had declined, the average scores of the subgroups of students had increased. This is an example of what is known in statistics as Simpson's paradox. According to the abstract of the report, "The author concludes that the report is generally right about steady trends, but that it is seriously flawed by errors in analysis, insufficient evidence, mischaracterizations of the international data, and a failure to consider the evidence that U.S students are performing at low levels." The three authors presented their report. David Kearns, Deputy Secretary of Education allegedly told the authors of the report, "You bury this or I'll bury you." Diane Ravitch disputes this quote. Education Week published an article on the Sandia report in 1991. Unlike the Nation at Risk report, the Sandia Report critique received almost no attention.

On the 25th anniversary of the release of A Nation at Risk, the organization Strong American Schools released a report card showing progress since the initial report. The organization's analysis said:

While the national conversation about education would never be the same, stunningly few of the Commission's recommendations actually have been enacted. Now is not the time for more educational research or reports or commissions. We have enough commonsense ideas, backed by decades of research, to significantly improve American schools. The missing ingredient isn't even educational at all. It's political. Too often, state and local leaders have tried to enact reforms of the kind recommended in A Nation at Risk only to be stymied by organized special interests and political inertia. Without vigorous national leadership to improve education, states and local school systems simply cannot overcome the obstacles to making the big changes necessary to significantly improve our nation's K-12 schools.

Salvatore Babones has criticized the composition and competences of the committee:

The commission included 12 administrators, 1 businessperson, 1 chemist, 1 physicist, 1 politician, 1 conservative activist, and 1 teacher. ... Just one practicing teacher and not a single academic expert on education. It should come as no surprise that a commission dominated by administrators found that the problems of U.S. schools were mainly caused by lazy students and unaccountable teachers. Administrative incompetence was not on the agenda. Nor were poverty, inequality, and racial discrimination.

== Librarians respond with the project "Libraries and the Learning Society" ==
In response to the A Nation at Risk report, the Department of Education Center for Libraries and Education Improvement invited leaders in library and information science to a meeting in September 1983 to launch the project "Libraries and the Learning Society". Four seminars, held in different cities, examined how public libraries, academic libraries, library and information science training institutions, and school library media centers could best respond to A Nation at Risk. A fifth seminar dealt with ways in which libraries should come together to link their resources to help create a Learning Society.
