= National Education Goals Panel =

The National Education Goals Panel (NEGP) was an organization formed in 1990 after a meeting of President George H.W. Bush and states' governors in Charlottesville in 1989. The organization was established to report on the nation's progress toward the six education goals adopted at the Charlottesville meeting. The 1994 Goals 2000 legislation formally established the National Education Goals Panel in federal law, and the legislation assigned it annual reporting responsibilities. The panel issued many reports between 1991 and 1999, and it was discontinued by the No Child Left Behind Act which became law in January, 2002.
