= National Center on Education and the Economy =

US nonprofit organization

- Abbreviation: NCEE
- Formation: 1988
- Founded at: Rochester, New York
- Registration no.: not-for-profit
- Headquarters: Washington, DC
- Key people: Marc Tucker, founder, president and CEO (1988–2019); Anthony Mackay, president and CEO (2019–present)
- Website: ncee.org

The National Center on Education and the Economy (NCEE) is an American not-for-profit education research, advocacy, and educator professional learning organization based in Washington, DC, that first formed in 1988 as the Carnegie Forum on Education and the Economy.

NCEE has a history of contributing to influential research reports on public education in the United States and advocating for large-scale education reform based on its international benchmarking research on high-performing, equitable education systems around the world. Its framework and model is presented in the Blueprint for a High-Performing Education System.

It has partnered with the National Conference of State Legislatures (NCSL), the U.S. Department of Education, the U.S. Department of Labor, school districts, state education departments, and the Organisation for Economic Co-operation and Development (OECD) on landmark education reports. It has conducted oversees research and site visits of top-performing countries.

Its funders include the Bill and Melinda Gates Foundation, the Annie E. Casey Foundation, the Stupski Foundation, and the Wallace Foundation.

NCEE's mission is, "To analyze the implications of changes in the international economy for American education, formulate an agenda for American education based on that analysis and seek wherever possible to accomplish that agenda through policy change and development of the resources educators would need to carry it out."

== History ==
Its precursor, the Carnegie Forum on Education and the Economy, was established by the Carnegie Corporation of New York in 1985. The National Board for Professional Teaching Standards was established in response to a 1986 report by Marc Tucker, "A Nation Prepared: Teachers for the 21st Century." This Board established the NCEE in 1988 with Tucker as founder, CEO, and president and based first in Rochester, New York.

Since 1989, NCEE has been researching the countries that consistently lead the world in the quality of their education systems when the performance of their students is compared to the performance of students in other countries. Major reports and publications NCEE has worked on include: A Nation Prepared: Teachers for the 21st Century America's Choice: High Skills or Low Wages, Strong Performers and Successful Reformers in Education, and No Time to Lose: How to Build a World-Class Education System State by State.

NCEE also participated in the National Skill Standards Board for the U.S. Department of Labor.

NCEE launched the National Institute for School Leadership (NISL) in 1999 as an educator professional learning and leadership development program.

In 2010, NCEE organized a pilot program with a $1.5 million planning grant from the Gates Foundation, that helped NCEE "work with states and districts" develop their Early College High School (ECHS) programs, through which students could take a mixture of high school and college classes, and receive both a high school diploma and up to two years of college credits. The goal was to insure that "students have mastered a set of basic requirements" and to reduce the "numbers of high school graduates who need remedial courses when they enroll in college."

NCEE's Center on International Education Benchmarking (CIEB) funds and conducts research to identify education strategies from countries that have top-performing education systems and whose students score well on the Programme for International Student Assessment, among other metrics.

NCEE was a consultant for the Kirwan Commission as it developed the Blueprint for Maryland's Future passed by the Maryland State Legislature in 2020, which included NCEE's "9 Building Blocks for a World-Class Education System" as a component of its work. It has also worked with the Pennsylvania state education department to create a superintendent leadership program.
