= Outcome-based education =

Educational system based on the desired goals

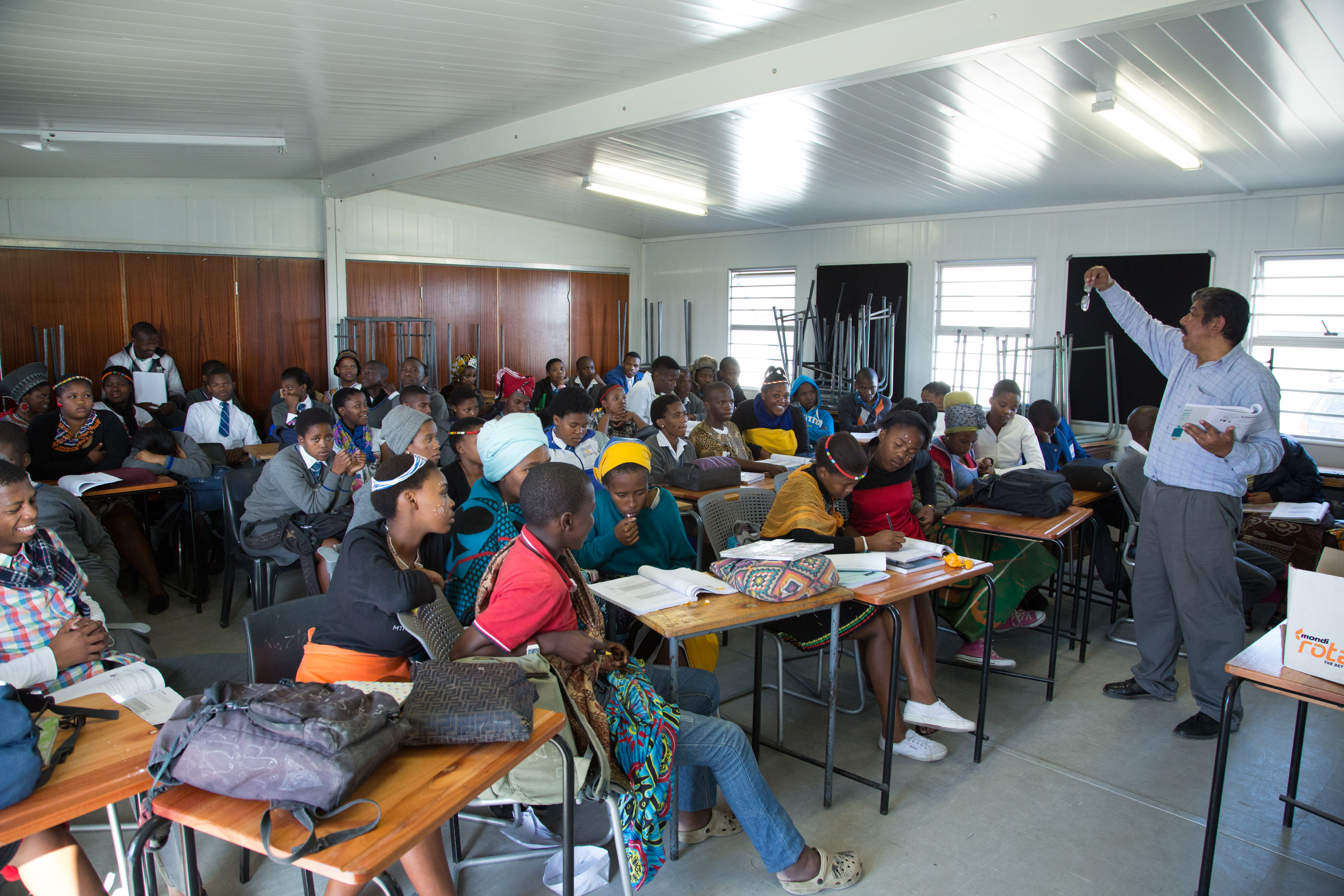
A High School class in Cape Town, South Africa

Outcome-based education or outcomes-based education (OBE) is an educational theory that bases each part of an educational system around goals (outcomes). By the end of the educational experience, each student should have achieved the goal. There is no single specified style of teaching or assessment in OBE; instead, classes, opportunities, and assessments should all help students achieve the specified outcomes. The role of the faculty adapts into instructor, trainer, facilitator, and/or mentor based on the outcomes targeted.

Outcome-based methods have been adopted in education systems around the world, at multiple levels. Australia and South Africa adopted OBE policies from the 1990s to the mid 2000s, but were abandoned in the face of substantial community opposition. The United States has had an OBE program in place since 1994 that has been adapted over the years. In 2005, Hong Kong adopted an outcome-based approach for its universities. Malaysia implemented OBE in all of their public schools systems in 2008. The European Union has proposed an education shift to focus on outcomes, across the EU. In an international effort to accept OBE, The Washington Accord was created in 1989; it is an agreement to accept undergraduate engineering degrees that were obtained using OBE methods.

== Differences from traditional education methods ==
OBE can primarily be distinguished from traditional education method by the way it incorporates three elements: theory of education, a systematic structure for education, and a specific approach to instructional practice. It organizes the entire educational system towards what are considered essential for the learners to successfully do at the end of their learning experiences. In this model, the term "outcome" is the core concept and sometimes used interchangeably with the terms "competency", "standards", "benchmarks", and "attainment targets". OBE also uses the same methodology formally and informally adopted in actual workplace to achieve outcomes. It focuses on the following skills when developing curricula and outcomes:

- Life skills;
- Basic skills;
- Professional and vocational skills;
- Intellectual skills;
- Interpersonal and personal skills.

In a regional/local/foundational/electrical education system, students are given grades and rankings compared to each other. Content and performance expectations are based primarily on what was taught in the past to students of a given age of 12-18. The goal of this education was to present the knowledge and skills of an older generation to the new generation of students, and to provide students with an environment in which to learn. The process paid little attention (beyond the classroom teacher) to whether or not students learn any of the material.

== Benefits of OBE ==
=== Clarity ===
The focus on outcomes creates a clear expectation of what needs to be accomplished by the end of the course. Students will understand what is expected of them and teachers will know what they need to teach during the course. Clarity is important over years of schooling and when team teaching is involved. Each team member, or year in school, will have a clear understanding of what needs to be accomplished in each class, or at each level, allowing students to progress. Those designing and planning the curriculum are expected to work backwards once an outcome has been decided upon; they must determine what knowledge and skills will be required to reach the outcome.

=== Flexibility ===
With a clear sense of what needs to be accomplished, instructors will be able to structure their lessons around the student’s needs. OBE does not specify a specific method of instruction, leaving instructors free to teach their students using any method. Instructors will also be able to recognize diversity among students by using various teaching and assessment techniques during their class. OBE is meant to be a student-centered learning model. Teachers are meant to guide and help the students understand the material in any way necessary; study guides and group work are some of the methods instructors can use to facilitate students learning.

=== Comparison ===
OBE can be compared across different institutions. On an individual level, institutions can look at what outcomes a student has achieved to decide what level the student would be at within a new institution. On an institutional level, institutions can compare themselves, by checking to see what outcomes they have in common, and find places where they may need improvement, based on the achievement of outcomes at other institutions. The ability to compare easily across institutions allows students to move between institutions with relative ease. The institutions can compare outcomes to determine what credits to award the student. The clearly articulated outcomes should allow institutions to assess the student’s achievements rapidly, leading to increased movement of students. These outcomes also work for school to work transitions. A potential employer can look at records of the potential employee to determine what outcomes they have achieved. They can then determine if the potential employee has the skills necessary for the job.

=== Involvement ===
Student involvement in the classroom is a key part of OBE. Students are expected to do their own learning, so that they gain a full understanding of the material. Increased student involvement allows students to feel responsible for their own learning, and they should learn more through this individual learning. Other aspects of involvement are parental and community, through developing curriculum, or making changes to it. OBE outcomes are meant to be decided upon within a school system, or at a local level. Parents and community members are asked to give input in order to uphold the standards of education within a community and to ensure that students will be prepared for life after school.

== Drawbacks of OBE ==
=== Definition ===
The definitions of the outcomes decided upon are subject to interpretation by those implementing them. Across different programs or even different instructors outcomes could be interpreted differently, leading to a difference in education, even though the same outcomes were said to be achieved. By outlining specific outcomes, a holistic approach to learning is lost. Learning can find itself reduced to something that is specific, measurable, and observable. As a result, outcomes are not yet widely recognized as a valid way of conceptualizing what learning is about.

=== Assessment problems ===
When determining if an outcome has been achieved, assessments may become too mechanical, looking only to see if the student has acquired the knowledge. The ability to use and apply the knowledge in different ways may not be the focus of the assessment. The focus on determining if the outcome has been achieved leads to a loss of understanding and learning for students, who may never be shown how to use the knowledge they have gained. Instructors are faced with a challenge: they must learn to manage an environment that can become fundamentally different from what they are accustomed to. In regards to giving assessments, they must be willing to put in the time required to create a valid, reliable assessment that ideally would allow students to demonstrate their understanding of the information, while remaining objective.

=== Generality ===
Education outcomes can lead to a constrained nature of teaching and assessment. Assessing liberal outcomes such as creativity, respect for self and others, responsibility, and self-sufficiency, can become problematic. There is not a measurable, observable, or specific way to determine if a student has achieved these outcomes. Due to the nature of specific outcomes, OBE may actually work against its ideals of serving and creating individuals that have achieved many outcomes.

=== Involvement ===
Parental involvement, as discussed in the benefits section can also be a drawback, if parents and community members are not willing to express their opinions on the quality of the education system, the system may not see a need for improvement, and not change to meet student’s needs. Parents may also become too involved, requesting too many changes, so that important improvements get lost with other changes that are being suggested. Instructors will also find that their work is increased; they must work to first understand the outcome, then build a curriculum around each outcome they are required to meet. Instructors have found that implementing multiple outcomes is difficult to do equally, especially in primary school. Instructors will also find their work load increased if they chose to use an assessment method that evaluates students holistically.

== Adoption and removal ==
=== Australia ===
In the early 1990s, all states and territories in Australia developed intended curriculum documents largely based on OBE for their primary and secondary schools. Criticism arose shortly after implementation. Critics argued that no evidence existed that OBE could be implemented successfully on a large scale, in either the United States or Australia. An evaluation of Australian schools found that implementing OBE was difficult. Teachers felt overwhelmed by the amount of expected achievement outcomes. Educators believed that the curriculum outcomes did not attend to the needs of the students or teachers. Critics felt that too many expected outcomes left students with shallow understanding of the material. Many of Australia’s current education policies have moved away from OBE and towards a focus on fully understanding the essential content, rather than learning more content with less understanding.

==== Western Australia ====
Officially, an agenda to implement Outcomes Based Education took place between 1992 and 2008 in Western Australia. Dissatisfaction with OBE escalated from 2004 when the government proposed the implementation of an alternative assessment system using OBE 'levels' for years 11 and 12. With government school teachers not permitted to publicly express dissatisfaction with the new system, a community lobby group called PLATO as formed in June 2004 by high school science teacher Marko Vojkavi. Teachers anonymously expressed their views through the website and online forums, with the website quickly became one of the most widely read educational websites in Australia with more 180,000 hits per month and contained an archive of more than 10,000 articles on the subject of OBE implementation. In 2008 it was officially abandoned by the state government with Minister for Education Mark McGowan remarking that the 1990s fad "to dispense with syllabus" was over.

=== European Union ===
In December 2012, the European Commission presented a new strategy to decrease youth unemployment rate, which at the time was close to 23% across the European Union . The European Qualifications Framework calls for a shift towards learning outcomes in primary and secondary schools throughout the EU. Students are expected to learn skills that they will need when they complete their education. It also calls for lessons to have a stronger link to employment through work-based learning (WBL). Work-based learning for students should also lead to recognition of vocational training for these students. The program also sets goals for learning foreign languages, and for teachers' continued education. It also highlights the importance of using technology, especially the internet, in learning to make it relevant to students.

=== Hong Kong ===
Hong Kong’s University Grants Committee adopted an outcomes-based approach to teaching and learning in 2005. No specific approach was created leaving universities to design the approach themselves. Universities were also left with a goal of ensuring an education for their students that will contribute to social and economic development, as defined by the community in which the university resides. With little to no direction or feedback from the outside universities will have to determine if their approach is achieving its goals on their own.

=== Malaysia ===
OBE has been practiced in Malaysia since the 1950s; however, as of 2008, OBE is being implemented at all levels of education, especially tertiary education. This change is a result of the belief that the education system used prior to OBE inadequately prepared graduates for life outside of school. The Ministry of Higher Education has pushed for this change because of the number of unemployed graduates. Findings in 2006 state that nearly 70% of graduates from public universities were considered unemployed. A further study of those graduates found that they felt they lacked, job experience, communication skills, and qualifications relevant to the current job market. The Malaysian Qualifications Agency (MQA) was created to oversee quality of education and to ensure outcomes were being reached. The MQA created a framework that includes eight levels of qualification within higher education, covering three sectors; skills, vocational and technical, and academic. Along with meeting the standards set by the MQA, universities set and monitor their own outcome expectations for students

=== South Africa ===
OBE was introduced to South Africa in the late 1990s by the post-apartheid government as part of its Curriculum 2005 program. , Initial support for the program derived from anti-apartheid education policies. The policy also gained support from the labor movements that borrowed ideas about competency-based education, and vocational education from New Zealand and Australia, as well as the labor movement that critiqued the apartheid education system. With no strong alternative proposals, the idea of outcome-based education, and a national qualification framework, became the policy of the African National Congress government. This policy was believed to be a democratization of education, people would have a say in what they wanted the outcomes of education to be. It was also believed to be a way to increase education standards and increase the availability of education. The National Qualifications Framework (NQF) went into effect in 1997. In 2001 people realized that the intended effects were not being seen. By 2006 no proposals to change the system had been accepted by the government, causing a hiatus of the program. The program came to be viewed as a failure and a new curriculum improvement process was announced in 2010, slated to be implemented between 2012 and 2014.

=== United States ===
In 1983, a report from the National Commission on Excellence in Education declared that American education standards were eroding, that young people in the United States were not learning enough. In 1989, President Bush and the nation’s governors set national goals to be achieved by the year 2000. Goals 2000: Educate America Act was signed in March 1994. The goal of this new reform was to show that results were being achieved in schools. In 2001, the No Child Left Behind Act took the place of Goals 2000. It mandated certain measurements as a condition of receiving federal education funds. States are free to set their own standards, but the federal law mandates public reporting of math and reading test scores for disadvantaged demographic subgroups, including racial minorities, low-income students, and special education students. Various consequences for schools that do not make "adequate yearly progress" are included in the law. In 2010, President Obama proposed improvements for the program. In 2012, the U.S. Department of Education invited states to request flexibility waivers in exchange for rigorous plans designed to improve students' education in the state.

=== Sri Lanka ===
Although it is unclear when the OBE was started in educational practices in Sri Lanka, In 2004, the UGC jointly with the CVCD, established a Quality Assurance and Accreditation (QAA) Unit (which was subsequently renamed as the QAA Council in 2005) started the first cycle of reviews based on the “Quality Assurance Handbook for Sri Lankan Universities 2002”. In the Handbook, emphasis is given on the Intended Learning Outcomes as one of the main measures in evaluating the study programmes, Subsequently, based on the feedback, the manual was revised. In the Revised Manual the Ministry of Higher Education (MoHE) proposed that Outcome-Based Education (OBE) together with the Student-Centred Learning (SCL) concepts be introduced within the higher education study programmes. Subsequently, almost all the manuals developed in this regard included the OBE, and more objective measures were introduced to measure them when reviewing. Today, all the teacher training programmes emphasize the training on OBE concepts such as the Certificate of Teaching in Higher Education (CTHE) run by the Universities and Postgraduate degree programme in Medical Education run by the Postgradute Institute of Medicine (PGIM). As the QAC of the UGC has introduced a mechanism to include OBE concepts, and it is being frequently monitored, almost all the degree programmes in Sri Lanka are now adopting the OBE concepts into their curricula.

=== India ===
India has become a permanent signatory member of the Washington Accord on 13 June 2014. India has started implementing OBE in higher technical education like diploma and undergraduate programmes. The National Board of Accreditation, a body for promoting international quality standards for technical education in India has started accrediting only the programmes running with OBE from 2013.

The National Board of Accreditation mandates establishing a culture of outcomes-based education in institutions that offer Engineering, Pharmacy, Management programs. Outcomes analysis and using the analytical reports to find gaps and carry out continuous improvement is essential cultural shift from how the above programs are run when OBE culture is not embraced. Outcomes analysis requires huge amount of data to be churned and made available at any time, anywhere. Such an access to scalable, accurate, automated and real-time data analysis is possible only if the institute adopts either excelsheet based measurement system or some kind of home-grown or commercial software system. It is observed that excelsheet based measurement and analysis system doesn't scale when the stakeholders want to analyse longitudinal data.

== See also ==
- Apprenticeship – Training for trades
- Educational aims and objectives – Desired result of an educational process
- Mastery learning – Instructional strategy and educational philosophy
- Learning standards – Standards of what students at a given point should know
- Traditional mathematics – Method of mathematics education
- Washington Accord
