= List of United States education acts =

This is a list of acts enacted by the United States Congress pertaining to education in the United States. Many laws related to education are codified under Title 20 of the United States Code. This list does not include resolutions designating a specific day, week, or month in honor of an educational goal.

Year	Title	Description	Public Law
1862	Morrill Act of 1862	Created the land-grant university system.	Pub. L. 37–130
1875	Civil Rights Act of 1875	Guaranteed equal treatment in public accommodations, including schools. Found unconstitutional in the Civil Rights Cases.	
1890	Morrill Act of 1890	Amended the Morrill Act of 1862 to increase federal funding for land-grant universities.	Pub. L. 51–841
1914	Smith–Lever Act of 1914	Created a cooperative extension service through land-grant universities.	Pub. L. 63–95
1917	Smith–Hughes National Vocational Education Act of 1917	Amended the Smith–Lever Act to fund vocational education. Repealed in 1997.	Pub. L. 64–347
1928	Reed–Jenkins Act	Repealed laws that funded Americanization schools for Native Americans.	Pub. L. 70–574
1940	Community Facilities Act of 1940 (Lanham Act)	Funded public works projects, including the construction of schools.	
1944	Servicemen's Readjustment Act of 1944 (G.I. Bill)	Provided benefits for World War II veterans, including student financial aid. Expired in 1956.	Pub. L. 78–346
1944	Public Health Service Act	Included a provision creating a scholarship through the National Health Service Corps.	Pub. L. 78–410
1946	Richard B. Russell National School Lunch Act	Funded school meals through the National School Lunch Program.	Pub. L. 79–396
1946	Vocational Education Act of 1946	Funded vocational education.	Pub. L. 79–586
1950	(No short title)	Provided federal funding for school districts in areas affected by federal activities.	Pub. L. 81–815
1950	(No short title)	Provided federal funding for school districts in areas affected by federal activities.	Pub. L. 81–874
1954	Agricultural Act of 1954	Included a provision establishing the Special Milk Program.	Pub. L. 83–690
1958	(No short title)	Made permanent programs to fund construction of schools in areas affected by federal activities.	Pub. L. 85–620
1958	National Defense Education Act	Authorized student loans. Funded math, science, and foreign language instruction. Funded graduate fellowships. Funded training of guidance counselors. Provided other education funding.	Pub. L. 85–864
1961	The Practical Nurse Training Extension Act of 1961	Amended the Vocational Education Act to extend grants for nurse training.	Pub. L. 87–22
1962	McIntire–Stennis Act of 1962	Funded agricultural research programs.	Pub. L. 87–788
1963	(No short title)	Reauthorized the National Defense Education Act. Expanded vocational education programs with the Vocational Education Act of 1963.	Pub. L. 88–210
1964	Civil Rights Act of 1964	Prohibited discrimination in public accommodations, including schools. Gave the Department of Justice the power to enforce desegregation of schools.	Pub. L. 88–352
1964	Economic Opportunity Act of 1964	Included a provision establishing the Head Start program.	Pub. L. 88–452
1965	Elementary and Secondary Education Act	Overhauled the role of federal government in public schools. Provided funding for public schools. Funded educator recruitment and development.	Pub. L. 89–10
1965	Higher Education Act of 1965	Overhauled the role of federal government in higher education. Provided financial aid for students and institutions.	Pub. L. 89–329
1966	Child Nutrition Act	Created nutritional standards for schools. Established the School Breakfast Program. Reauthorized the Special Milk Program.	Pub. L. 89–642
1966	Elementary and Secondary Education Amendments of 1966	Amended distribution of aid to support education for low-income families. Supported adult education programs through the Adult Education Act of 1966.	Pub. L. 89–750
1966	National Sea Grant College and Program Act of 1966		
1966	Elementary and Secondary Education Amendments of 1966		Pub. L. 89–750
1967	Education Professions Development Act of 1967	Amended Title V of the Higher Education Act to improve teacher training.	Pub. L. 90–35
1968	Elementary and Secondary Education Amendments of 1967	Amended the Elementary and Secondary Education Act to include the Bilingual Education Act. Included the General Education Provisions Act. Made other minor amendments.	Pub. L. 90–247
1968	Vocational Education Amendments of 1968		Pub. L. 90–576
1969	Emergency Insured Student Loan Act of 1969		
1970	Drug Abuse Education Act of 1970		
1972	Education Amendments of 1972	Amended education law to prohibit sex-based discrimination through Title IX. Reauthorized and amended various education laws.	Pub. L. 92–318
1973	(No short title)	Authorized additional funding to states for the National School Lunch Program.	Pub. L. 93–13
1973	(No short title)	Extended the National Sea Grant College and Program Act.	Pub. L. 93–73
1973	Rehabilitation Act of 1973	Reformed vocational education funding. Established additional protections against discrimination. Provided protections for students with disabilities.	Pub. L. 93–112
1973	National School Lunch and Child Nutrition Act Amendments		Pub. L. 93–150
1973	(No short title)	Delayed the Head Start fee schedule to 1975.	Pub. L. 93–202
1974	(No short title)	Extended funding through to General Education Provisions Act to 1975.	Pub. L. 93–269
1974	Education Amendments of 1974	Protected gender equality in education through the Women's Educational Equity Act. Expanded prohibition of discrimination in schools through the Equal Educational Opportunities Act of 1974. Reauthorized and amended various education laws.	Pub. L. 93–380
1974	(No short title)	Extended the National Health Service Corps scholarship program through FY1975.	Pub. L. 93–385
1974	Family Educational Rights and Privacy Act (FERPA)	Granted privacy protections over school records to parents and students.	
1974	Alcohol and Drug Abuse Education Act Amendments	Reauthorized the Drug Abuse Education Act.	Pub. L. 93–422
1975	Indian Self-Determination and Education Assistance Act of 1975	Provided funding for programs on Indian reservations, including schools.	Pub. L. 93–638
1975	Harry S Truman Memorial Scholarship Act	Created the Harry S. Truman Memorial Scholarship program.	Pub. L. 93–642
1975	Emergency Technical Provisions Act	Reauthorized the Higher Education Act and the Emergency Insured Student Loan Act through FY1976.	Pub. L. 94–43
1975	Education Division and Related Agencies Appropriation Act	Authorized funding for the Office of Education and related agencies.	Pub. L. 94–94
1975	Education for All Handicapped Children Act of 1975	Expanded protections for students with disabilities. Guaranteed the right for all children with disabilities to receive education.	Pub. L. 94–142
1975	(No short title)	Authorized agreements with state educational agencies and nonprofit agencies to promote reading programs. Authorized funding for book distribution programs.	Pub. L. 94–194
1976	(No short title)	Authorized funds for Allen J. Ellender Fellowships and removed the cap on the number of fellowships to be awarded.	Pub. L. 94–277
1976	Sea Grant Program Improvement Act		Pub. L. 94–461
1976	Education Amendments of 1976		Pub. L. 94–482
1977	George Washington University Charter Restatement Act	Restated the charter of George Washington University.	Pub. L. 95–8
1977	(No short title)	Made minor amendments to the Education Amendments of 1976.	Pub. L. 95–43
1977	Education of the Handicapped Amendments	Reauthorized the Education of the Handicapped Act through FY1982.	Pub. L. 95–49
1977	Education Amendments of 1977	Reauthorized certain programs under the Elementary and Secondary Education Act.	Pub. L. 95–112
1977	National School Lunch Act and Child Nutrition Amendments	Amended several aspects of the National School Lunch Act and the Child Nutrition Act	Pub. L. 95–166
1977	(No short title)	Amended the Higher Education Act to grant the Trust Territory of the Pacific Islands and the Northern Mariana Islands the same benefits under the act as states.	Pub. L. 95–180
1978	Hubert H. Humphrey Institute of Public Affairs and the Everett McKinley Dirksen Congressional Leadership Research Center Assistance Act	Authorized financial assistance to the Hubert H. Humphrey Institute and the Everett McKinley Dirksen Congressional Leadership Research Center.	Pub. L. 95–270
1978	Alcohol and Drug Abuse Education Amendments		Pub. L. 95–336
1978	Education Amendments of 1978		Pub. L. 95–561
1978	Middle Income Student Assistance Act	Expanded eligibility for student financial aid.	Pub. L. 95–566
1978	Child Nutrition Amendments	Extended the provisions of the National School Lunch Act.	Pub. L. 95–627
1979	(No short title)		Pub. L. 96–46
1979	Higher Education Technical Amendments of 1979		Pub. L. 96–49
1979	Department of Education Organization Act	Created the United States Department of Education.	Pub. L. 96–88
1979	(No short title)	Amended the Higher Education Act to allocate education funding reductions equally between the states.	Pub. L. 96–96
1980	Education Amendments of 1980		Pub. L. 96–374
1980	(No short title)	Granted the Internal Revenue Service the authority to disclose information to the Department of Education regarding students that default on student loans.	Pub. L. 96–603
1981	(No short title)	Authorized the George Washington University Higher Education Facilities Revenue Bond Act of 1981 of the District of Columbia to take effect immediately.	Pub. L. 97–107
1982	Student Financial Assistance Technical Amendments Act of 1982	Amended the Higher Education Act to apply limitations to Pell Grants.	Pub. L. 97–301
1982	(No short title)	Granted the Council of the District of Columbia the power to issue revenue bonds to finance college programs.	Pub. L. 97–328
1983	Student Loan Consolidation and Technical Amendments Act of 1983	Reauthorized the authority of Sallie Mae to consolidate student loans.	Pub. L. 98–79
1983	Challenge Grant Amendments of 1983	Created a program to provide matching endowment grants for colleges eligible under the Challenge Grant Program.	Pub. L. 98–95
1983	Education of the Handicapped Act Amendments of 1983		Pub. L. 98–199
1983	(No short title)		Pub. L. 98–211
1984	(No short title)	Increased funding for grants under Title III of the Higher Education Act.	Pub. L. 98–312
1984	Education for Economic Security Act	Implemented measures to promote math and science. Required schools to provide equal access to extracurricular clubs without discriminating by belief through the Equal Access Act. Required measures against asbestos in schools through the Asbestos School Hazard Abatement Act of 1984.	Pub. L. 98–377
1984	(No short title)	Recognized arts education as a priority in the United States.	Pub. L. 98–410
1984	Education Amendments of 1984		Pub. L. 98–511
1984	Carl D. Perkins Vocational and Technical Education Act (Perkins I)	Renamed the Vocational Education Act. Funded vocational education for students with disabilities, poor students, adult students, single parents, and students in correctional institutions.	Pub. L. 98–524
1984	Human Services Reauthorization Act		Pub. L. 98–558
1985	Nurse Education Amendments of 1985		Pub. L. 99–92
1985	Health Professions Training Assistance Act of 1985		Pub. L. 99–129
1986	Consolidated Omnibus Budget Reconciliation Act of 1985	Included the Student Financial Assistance Amendments of 1985 under Title XVI.	Pub. L. 99–272
1986	Student Financial Assistance Technical Corrections Act of 1986	Amended the Consolidated Omnibus Budget Reconciliation Act of 1985 to provide for reimbursement of costs associated with default prevention.	Pub. L. 99–320
1986	(No short title)	Amended state allotments under the Carl D. Perkins Vocational Education Act.	Pub. L. 99–357
1986	Education of the Deaf Act of 1986		Pub. L. 99–371
1986	Education of the Handicapped Amendments of 1986		Pub. L. 99–457
1986	Higher Education Amendments of 1986		Pub. L. 99–498
1986	Anti-Drug Abuse Act of 1986	Implemented measures against drugs, including a requirement for drug abuse prevention programs in colleges through the Drug Free Schools and Communities Act.	Pub. L. 99–570
1986	(No short title)	Authorized funds for the Joseph W. Martin Institute for Law and Society at Stonehill College.	Pub. L. 99–608
1987	Higher Education Technical Amendments Act of 1987		Pub. L. 100–50
1987	Excellence in Minority Health Education and Care Act	Amended the Public Health Service Act to provide grants for health professions schools.	Pub. L. 100–110
1987	(No short title)	Authorized funding for the Close Up Foundation to conduct the Civic Achievement Award Program in Honor of the Office of Speaker of the House of Representatives.	Pub. L. 100–158
1987	Civil Rights Restoration Act of 1987	Required public accommodations to comply with federal civil rights law in all aspects of its operations to receive federal funding, including in schools.	Pub. L. 100–259
1988	Augustus F. Hawkins-Robert T. Stafford Elementary and Secondary School Improvement Amendments of 1988		Pub. L. 100–297
1988	(No short title)	Amended the effective date of the Augustus F. Hawkins-Robert T. Stafford Elementary and Secondary School Improvement Amendments of 1988.	Pub. L. 100–351
1988	(No short title)	Removed an exemption for Supplemental Loans for Students eligibility requirements.	Pub. L. 100–369
1988	National Geography Studies Centers Act	Reauthorized the Library Services and Construction Act through FY1989. Funded the National Geography Studies Centers. Reauthorized funding for the United States Institute of Peace through FY1993.	Pub. L. 100–569
1989	(No short title)	Made a correction in the Education and Training for a Competitive America Act.	Pub. L. 101–26
1989	(No short title)	Authorized funding for the Close Up Foundation. Loosened curriculum requirements for participation and associated grants.	Pub. L. 101–118
1989	Head Start Supplemental Authorization Act of 1989	Increased funding for the Head Start Program.	Pub. L. 101–120
1989	(No short title)	Authorized reimbursement for expenses to personnel of the James Madison Memorial Fellowship Foundation.	Pub. L. 101–208
1989	Drug-Free Schools and Communities Act Amendments of 1989	Amended the Drug Free School Zones Act to modify regulations and requirements for federal funding.	Pub. L. 101–226
1990	(No short title)	Extended school dropout demonstration programs through FY1991.	Pub. L. 101–250
1990	Library Services and Construction Act Amendments of 1990		Pub. L. 101–254
1990	(No short title)	Authorized funding to pay for 50% of the costs to the Museum of Tolerance to operate Holocaust education programs.	Pub. L. 101–300
1990	1992 National Assessment of Chapter 1 Act		Pub. L. 101–305
1990	(No short title)	Amended the Higher Education Act to clarify when the National Commission on Responsibilities for Financing Postsecondary Education is terminated.	Pub. L. 101–324
1990	Americans with Disabilities Act of 1990	Prohibited discrimination against people with disabilities in public accommodations, including in schools.	Pub. L. 101–336
1990	Carl D. Perkins Vocational and Applied Technology Education Act Amendments of 1990 (Perkins II)	Reauthorized Perkins I. Created the Tech Prep program to support vocational education. Repealed the extra funding for specific groups from Perkins I.	Pub. L. 101–392
1990	Individuals with Disabilities Education Act	Amended the Education for All Handicapped Children Act to guarantee a Free Appropriate Public Education for students with disabilities.	Pub. L. 101–476
1990	(No short title)	Privatized the Civic Achievement Award Program in Honor of the Office of Speaker of the House of Representatives.	Pub. L. 101–483
1990	Student Right-To-Know and Campus Security Act	Required universities receiving federal aid to disclose criminal statistics on campus.	Pub. L. 101–542
1990	Excellence in Mathematics, Science and Engineering Education Act of 1990		Pub. L. 101–589
1990	School Dropout Prevention and Basic Skills Improvement Act of 1990		Pub. L. 101–600
1990	(No short title)	Extended appropriations for the Robert A. Taft Institute of Government through FY1994.	Pub. L. 101–638
1990	Gun-Free School Zones Act of 1990	Prohibited firearms in school zones. Ruled unconstitutional in United States v. Lopez and amended in 1996 to comply with the Constitution.	Pub. L. 101–647
1991	Higher Education Technical Amendments of 1991		Pub. L. 102–26
1991	Education Council Act of 1991	Created the National Education Commission on Time and Learning Act. Authorized a grant to the National Writing Project. Created the "We the People...the Citizen and the Constitution" program. Created the National Council on Education Standards and Testing through the National Council on Education Standards and Testing Act.	Pub. L. 102–62
1991	National Literacy Act of 1991		Pub. L. 102–73
1991	(No short title)	Recognized adult education as a priority of the federal government.	Pub. L. 102–74
1991	National Dropout Prevention Act of 1991		Pub. L. 102–103
1991	Individuals with Disabilities Education Act Amendments of 1991		Pub. L. 102–119
1991	Dropout Prevention Technical Correction Amendment of 1991	Restored federal funding provisions that were eliminated by the National Dropout Prevention Act.	Pub. L. 102–159
1992	(No short title)	Authorized members of the Board of Trustees of the James Madison Memorial Fellowship Foundation to serve in a transitional period after their terms expire.	Pub. L. 102–221
1992	Higher Education Amendments of 1992		Pub. L. 102–325
1992	(No short title)	Amended the National Education Commission on Time and Learning Act to extend its provisions by one year.	Pub. L. 102–359
1992	Education of the Deaf Act Amendments of 1992		Pub. L. 102–421
1992	(No short title)	Authorized financial assistance to establish the Mary McLeod Bethune Memorial Fine Arts Center at Bethune–Cookman University.	Pub. L. 102–423
1992	Scientific and Advanced-Technology Act of 1992	Authorized competitive grants to colleges for technical training in technology fields.	Pub. L. 102–476
1992	Ready to Learn Act	Amended the Elementary and Secondary Education Act to authorize funding for Ready to Learn television programs.	Pub. L. 102–545
1992	Head Start Improvement Act of 1992		Pub. L. 102–763
1993	(No short title)	Amended the General Education Provisions Act to create trial assessments for the National Assessment of Educational Progress.	Pub. L. 103–33
1993	(No short title)	Extended the migrant student record transfer system.	Pub. L. 103–59
1993	Higher Education Technical Amendments of 1993	Made minor corrections to the Higher Education Act.	Pub. L. 103–208
1994	(No short title)	Extended the student loan default exemption for HBCUs and tribal colleges.	Pub. L. 103–235
1994	(No short title)	Abolished the National Commission on Time and Learning.	Pub. L. 103–290
1994	Improving America's Schools Act of 1994		Pub. L. 103–382
1994	Goals 2000: Educate America Act	Created a national education reform framework. Also included the National Skill Standards Act of 1994 and the Educational Research, Development, Dissemination, and Improvement Act of 1994.	Pub. L. 103–227
1994	(No short title)	Recognized applications by the Window Rock Unified School District for federal funding.	Pub. L. 103–445
1995	Omnibus Consolidated Rescissions and Appropriations Act of 1996	Included the District of Columbia School Reform Act of 1995, adding charter schools to the Washington, D.C. school system.	Pub. L. 104–134 (text) (PDF)
1996	Impact Aid Technical Amendments of 1996	Made minor amendments to the Elementary and Secondary Education Act.	Pub. L. 104–195 (text) (PDF)
1996	Omnibus Consolidated Appropriations Act of 1997	Included a provision that amended the Gun-Free School Zones Act of 1990 to limit its enforcement to firearms that moved through interstate commerce.	Pub. L. 104–208 (text) (PDF)
1996	(No short title)	Amended the Higher Education Act to indefinitely extend a grant program for Historically Black Graduate or Professional Schools.	Pub. L. 104–141 (text) (PDF)
1997	Individuals with Disabilities Education Act Amendments of 1997		Pub. L. 105–17 (text) (PDF)
1997	Balanced Budget Act of 1997	Included a provision that repealed the Smith–Hughes Act.	Pub. L. 105–33 (text) (PDF)
1997	Need-Based Educational Aid Antitrust Protection Act of 1997	Extended through FY2001 the antitrust exemption of the Improving America's Schools Act of 1994.	Pub. L. 105–144 (text) (PDF)
1998	Workforce Investment Act of 1998	Included the creation of an adult literacy program. Replaced the Adult Education Act and the National Literacy Act.	Pub. L. 105–220 (text) (PDF)
1998	Higher Education Amendments of 1998		Pub. L. 105–244 (text) (PDF)
1998	Charter School Expansion Act of 1998	Amended the Elementary and Secondary Education Act to make charter schools eligible for federal funding.	Pub. L. 105–278 (text) (PDF)
1998	Carl D. Perkins Vocational and Applied Technology Education Amendments of 1998 (Perkins III)	Reauthorized Perkins II. Set accountability requirements for state vocational education programs.	Pub. L. 105–332 (text) (PDF)
1998	William F. Goodling Child Nutrition Reauthorization Act of 1998	Reauthorized the Child Nutrition Act. Expanded subsidies under the bill.	Pub. L. 105–336 (text) (PDF)
1998	Police, Fire, and Emergency Officers Educational Assistance Act of 1998	Provided student financial aid for the dependents of first responders that are injured or killed in the line of duty.	Pub. L. 105–390 (text) (PDF)
1999	(No short title)	Recognized applications by the Dodson, Montana school district for Impact Aid payments.	Pub. L. 106–3 (text) (PDF)
1999	Education Flexibility Partnership Act of 1999	Admitted all states into the Ed-Flex Partnership and extended the program through 2004.	Pub. L. 106–25 (text) (PDF)
1999	District of Columbia College Access Act of 1999	Provided funding for students in Washington, D.C. to attend universities in Maryland and Virginia at in-state tuition.	Pub. L. 106–98 (text) (PDF)
2000	(No short title)	Amended the Higher Education Act to streamline the grant application process for tribal colleges.	Pub. L. 106–211 (text) (PDF)
2000	National Police Athletic League Youth Enrichment Act of 2000	Funded grants for the Police Athletic League.	Pub. L. 106–859 (text) (PDF)
2001	Need-Based Educational Aid Act of 2001	Extended through FY2008 the antitrust exemption of the Improving America's Schools Act of 1994.	Pub. L. 107–72 (text) (PDF)
2002	No Child Left Behind Act of 2001	Reauthorized the Elementary and Secondary Education Act. Required states to implement standardized tests and penalized schools with poor performance.	Pub. L. 107–110 (text) (PDF)
2002	Higher Education Relief Opportunities for Students Act of 2001	Waived student financial aid requirements for military service-members affected by national emergencies declared by reason of terrorist attacks.	Pub. L. 107–122 (text) (PDF)
2002	(No short title)	Amended the Higher Education Act to establish fixed interest rates for student loans.	Pub. L. 107–139 (text) (PDF)
2002	District of Columbia College Access Improvement Act of 2002	Modified student financial aid eligibility requirements in Washington, D.C.	Pub. L. 107–157 (text) (PDF)
2002	Technology, Education and Copyright Harmonization Act (TEACH Act)	Exempted educators from copyright laws when distributing educational materials in some circumstances.	Pub. L. 107–273 (text) (PDF)
2002	(No short title)	Included the Education Sciences Reform Act of 2002, the Educational Technical Assistance Act of 2002, and the National Assessment of Educational Progress Authorization Act. Created the Institute of Education Sciences and various educational research centers.	Pub. L. 107–279 (text) (PDF)
2003	Higher Education Relief Opportunities for Students Act of 2003	Waived student aid requirements for students serving in the military during a military conflict or national emergency.	Pub. L. 108–76 (text) (PDF)
2003	(No short title)	Amended the Higher Education Act to modify the rules of the Federal Family Education Loan Program in regard to foreign medical schools.	Pub. L. 108–98 (text) (PDF)
2003	Consolidated Appropriations Act, 2004	Included the D.C. School Choice Incentive Act of 2003 that supported private schools in Washington D.C.	Pub. L. 108–199 (text) (PDF)
2004	Child Nutrition and WIC Reauthorization Act of 2004	Reauthorized the Child Nutrition Act. Required all school districts using the act's funds to create comprehensive wellness policies.	Pub. L. 108–265 (text) (PDF)
2004	Higher Education Extension Act of 2004	Extended the Higher Education Act through FY2005.	Pub. L. 108–366 (text) (PDF)
2004	Asthmatic Schoolchildren's Treatment and Health Management Act of 2004	Amended the Public Health Service Act to give preference for grants to states that allow students to self-administer asthma medication.	Pub. L. 108–377 (text) (PDF)
2004	Taxpayer-Teacher Protection Act of 2004	Modified rules for student loan forgiveness for teachers.	Pub. L. 108–409 (text) (PDF)
2004	Individuals with Disabilities Education Improvement Act (IDEA 2004)	Reauthorized the Individuals with Disabilities Education Act. Authorized additional education grants.	Pub. L. 108–446 (text) (PDF)
2004	American History and Civics Education Act of 2004	Created 12 grants for institutions chosen for their expertise in history education.	Pub. L. 108–474 (text) (PDF)
2005	Pell Grant Hurricane and Disaster Relief Act	Waived conditions of Pell Grants for students affected by major disasters.	Pub. L. 109–66 (text) (PDF)
2005	Student Grant Hurricane and Disaster Relief Act	Waived conditions of student financial aid for students affected by major disasters.	Pub. L. 109–67 (text) (PDF)
2005	(No short title)	Extended the Higher Education Relief Opportunities for Students Act of 2003 through 2007.	Pub. L. 109–78 (text) (PDF)
2005	Higher Education Extension Act of 2005	Extended the Higher Education Act to December 31, 2005	Pub. L. 109–81 (text) (PDF)
2005	Natural Disaster Student Aid Fairness Act	Waived matching fund and reallocation requirements for federal funding of higher education for areas affected by Hurricane Katrina or Hurricane Rita.	Pub. L. 109–86 (text) (PDF)
2005	Second Higher Education Extension Act of 2005	Extended the Higher Education Act to March 31, 2006.	Pub. L. 109–150 (text) (PDF)
2006	(No short title)	Extended waiving of regulatory requirements of federally funded education programs through the Ed-Flex program.	Pub. L. 109–211 (text) (PDF)
2006	Higher Education Extension Act of 2006	Extended the Higher Education Act to June 30, 2006.	Pub. L. 109–212 (text) (PDF)
2006	Second Higher Education Extension Act of 2006	Extended the Higher Education Act to September 30, 2006.	Pub. L. 109–238 (text) (PDF)
2006	Carl D. Perkins Career and Technical Education Act of 2006 (Perkins IV)	Reauthorized Perkins III.	Pub. L. 109–270 (text) (PDF)
2006	Third Higher Education Extension Act of 2006	Extended the Higher Education Act to June 30, 2007. Modified rules for the Federal Family Education Loan Program. Provided student loan forgiveness to the families of 9/11 casualties.	Pub. L. 109–292 (text) (PDF)
2006	(No short title)	Extended through FY2007 the power of the Secretary of Education to waive conditions for federal assistance to states affected by Hurricane Katrina or Hurricane Rita.	Pub. L. 109–323 (text) (PDF)
2007	First Higher Education Extension Act of 2007	Extended the Higher Education Act to July 31, 2007.	Pub. L. 110–44 (text) (PDF)
2007	Second Higher Education Extension Act of 2007	Extended the Higher Education Act to October 31, 2007.	Pub. L. 110–51 (text) (PDF)
2007	America COMPETES Act	Funded research and development programs.	Pub. L. 110–69 (text) (PDF)
2007	College Cost Reduction and Access Act	Increased Pell Grant awards and reformed student loan repayment.	Pub. L. 110–84 (text) (PDF)
2007	(No short title)	Permanently extended the provisions for active duty service members in the Higher Education Relief Opportunities for Students Act of 2003.	Pub. L. 110–93 (text) (PDF)
2007	Third Higher Education Extension Act of 2007	Extended the Higher Education Act to March 31, 2008.	Pub. L. 110–109 (text) (PDF)
2007	(No short title)	Made minor amendments to the Higher Education Act.	Pub. L. 110–153 (text) (PDF)
2007	Improving Head Start for School Readiness Act of 2007	Reauthorized the Head Start program. Guaranteed eligibility for homeless children.	Pub. L. 110–134 (text) (PDF)
2008	Higher Education Extension Act of 2008	Extended the Higher Education Act to April 30, 2008.	Pub. L. 110–198 (text) (PDF)
2008	(No short title)	Extended the Higher Education Act to May 31, 2008.	Pub. L. 110–230 (text) (PDF)
2008	(No short title)	Extended the Higher Education Act to June 30, 2008.	Pub. L. 110–238 (text) (PDF)
2008	(No short title)	Extended the Higher Education Act to July 31, 2008.	Pub. L. 110–256 (text) (PDF)
2008	(No short title)	Extended the Higher Education Act to August 15, 2008.	Pub. L. 110–300 (text) (PDF)
2008	Need-Based Educational Aid Act of 2008	Extended through 2015 the antitrust exemption of the Improving America's Schools Act of 1994.	Pub. L. 110–327 (text) (PDF)
2008	Ensuring Continued Access to Student Loans Act of 2008	Expanded the Federal Family Education Loan Program.	Pub. L. 110–350 (text) (PDF)
2008	Supplemental Appropriations Act, 2008	Included the Post-9/11 Veterans Educational Assistance Act of 2008, which provided student financial aid benefits for veterans.	Pub. L. 110–252 (text) (PDF)
2008	Higher Education Opportunity Act	Reauthorized the Higher Education Act. Expanded student loan discharges for people with disabilities.	Pub. L. 110–315 (text) (PDF)
2008	(No short title)	Extended the Federal Family Education Loan Program to 2010.	Pub. L. 110–350 (text) (PDF)
2008	(No short title)	Extended the Secretary of Education's authority to provide school funding for states affected by Hurricane Katrina or Hurricane Rita.	Pub. L. 110–366 (text) (PDF)
2009	American Recovery and Reinvestment Act of 2009	Included funding for the Race to the Top program.	Pub. L. 111–5 (text) (PDF)
2009	Edward M. Kennedy Serve America Act	Included a provision that created the Education Corps through the AmeriCorps program.	Pub. L. 111–13 (text) (PDF)
2009	(No short title)	Made minor amendments to the Higher Education Act.	Pub. L. 111–39 (text) (PDF)
2009	Morris K. Udall Scholarship and Excellence in National Environmental Policy Amendments Act of 2009	Renamed the Morris K. Udall Scholarship and Excellence in National Environmental and Native American Public Policy Act of 1992. Amended the rules for use of the law's grants.	Pub. L. 111–90 (text) (PDF)
2010	Health Care and Education Reconciliation Act of 2010	Included the Student Aid and Fiscal Responsibility Act to expand federal Pell Grants.	Pub. L. 111–152 (text) (PDF)
2010	Healthy, Hunger-Free Kids Act of 2010	Reauthorized the Child Nutrition Act. Expanded federal nutrition standards for schools.	Pub. L. 111–296 (text) (PDF)
2011	America COMPETES Reauthorization Act	Reauthorized the America COMPETES Act.	Pub. L. 111–358 (text) (PDF)
2011	Department of Defense and Full-Year Continuing Appropriations Act, 2011	Included the Scholarships for Opportunity and Results Act (SOAR Act) that reauthorized the DC School Choice Inventive Act of 2003.	Pub. L. 112–10 (text) (PDF)
2012	SOAR Technical Corrections Act	Made minor corrections to the SOAR Act.	Pub. L. 112–92 (text) (PDF)
2013	Uninterrupted Scholars Act	Amended FERPA to define exemptions for information released to Department of Education programs.	Pub. L. 112–278 (text) (PDF)
2013	Bipartisan Student Loan Certainty Act of 2013	Set fixed interest rates on student loans.	Pub. L. 113–28 (text) (PDF)
2014	Workforce Innovation and Opportunity Act	Included the Adult Education and Family Literacy Act, which provided grants to states to create adult literacy programs.	Pub. L. 113–128 (text) (PDF)
2014	(No short title)	Extended the Higher Education Act through FY2015.	Pub. L. 113–174 (text) (PDF)
2015	STEM Education Act of 2015	Funded STEM education in schools. Funded fellowships for STEM teachers.	Pub. L. 114–59 (text) (PDF)
2015	Every Student Succeeds Act	Reauthorized the Elementary and Secondary Education Act. Repealed the testing requirements established by the No Child Left Behind Act.	Pub. L. 114–95 (text) (PDF)
2015	Federal Perkins Loan Program Extension Act of 2015	Extended distribution of Federal Perkins Loans to 2017.	Pub. L. 114–105 (text) (PDF)
2017	(No short title)	Nullified a Department of Education rule relating to accountability for state education plans.	Pub. L. 115–13 (text) (PDF)
2017	(No short title)	Nullified the Teacher Preparation Issues rule established by the Department of Education.	Pub. L. 115–14 (text) (PDF)
2017	Hurricanes Harvey, Irma, and Maria Education Relief Act of 2017	Waived financial aid requirements for students affected by tropical storms. Expired in 2018.	Pub. L. 115–64 (text) (PDF)
2017	Harry W. Colmery Veterans Educational Assistance Act (Forever GI Bill)	Extended veteran's financial aid benefits from the Post-9/11 Veterans Educational Assistance Act beyond the original 15 year limit.	Pub. L. 115–48 (text) (PDF)
2018	Strengthening Career and Technical Education for the 21st Century Act (Perkins V)	Reauthorized Perkins IV.	Pub. L. 115–224 (text) (PDF)
2019	Recognizing Achievement in Classified School Employees Act	Created the Recognizing Inspiring School Employees award.	Pub. L. 116–13 (text) (PDF)
2020	Never Again Education Act	Authorized various Holocaust education programs.	Pub. L. 116–141 (text) (PDF)
2020	Impact Aid Coronavirus Relief Act	Included an extension to Migrant Education Program funding.	Pub. L. 116–211 (text) (PDF)
2020	Stop Student Debt Relief Scams Act of 2019	Criminalized fraudulent use of student loan data.	Pub. L. 116–251 (text) (PDF)
2020	HBCU PARTNERS Act	Required federal agencies to create frameworks for historically black colleges and universities to participate in federal programs.	Pub. L. 116–270 (text) (PDF)
2021	Consider Teachers Act of 2021	Increased flexibility of the TEACH grant program.	Pub. L. 117–49 (text) (PDF)
2021	K-12 Cybersecurity Act of 2021	Required the Cybersecurity and Infrastructure Security Agency to study cybersecurity risks in schools and develop online training for school officials.	Pub. L. 117–47 (text) (PDF)
2022	Supplemental Impact Aid Flexibility Act	Modified the Impact Aid Program.	Pub. L. 117–83 (text) (PDF)

== See also ==
- Education policy
- Education policy of the United States
- List of United States federal legislation
