= Safe schools =

Safe schools may refer to:

- Safe Schools Declaration, international
- Safe Schools Act, Ontario, Canada
- Safe Schools/Healthy Students, United States
- Safe Schools Coalition Australia
