= EPDA =

EPDA is an acronym that may refer to:

- Education Professions Development Act
- Embedded pushdown automaton
- European Product Design Award
