= Education policy of the United States =

The federal government of the United States has limited authority to act on education, and education policy serves to support the education systems of state and local governments through funding and regulation of elementary, secondary, and post-secondary education. The Department of Education serves as the primary government organization responsible for enacting federal education policy in the United States.

American education policy first emerged when the Congress of the Confederation oversaw the establishment of schools in American territories, and the government's role in shaping education policy expanded through the creation of land-grant universities in the 19th century. Federal oversight of education continued to increase during the desegregation of schools and the Great Society program. The Elementary and Secondary Education Act and the Higher Education Act were passed in 1965, forming the basis of subsequent education policy in the United States. The Education for All Handicapped Children Act expanded access for students with disabilities in 1975.

The federal government is responsible for ensuring that state education laws and school practices comply with the Constitution of the United States. This includes protecting the Constitutional rights of students, ensuring students have equal access to education, and governing the presence of religion in schools. Another role of the federal government is to provide state governments with funding for public schools. The government also implements other policies or requires states to do so as a condition of federal funding, including child care programs, safety regulations, and standardized tests. The federal government's role in higher education is limited, though it does provide financial support for qualifying students and institutions.

== Policy development ==
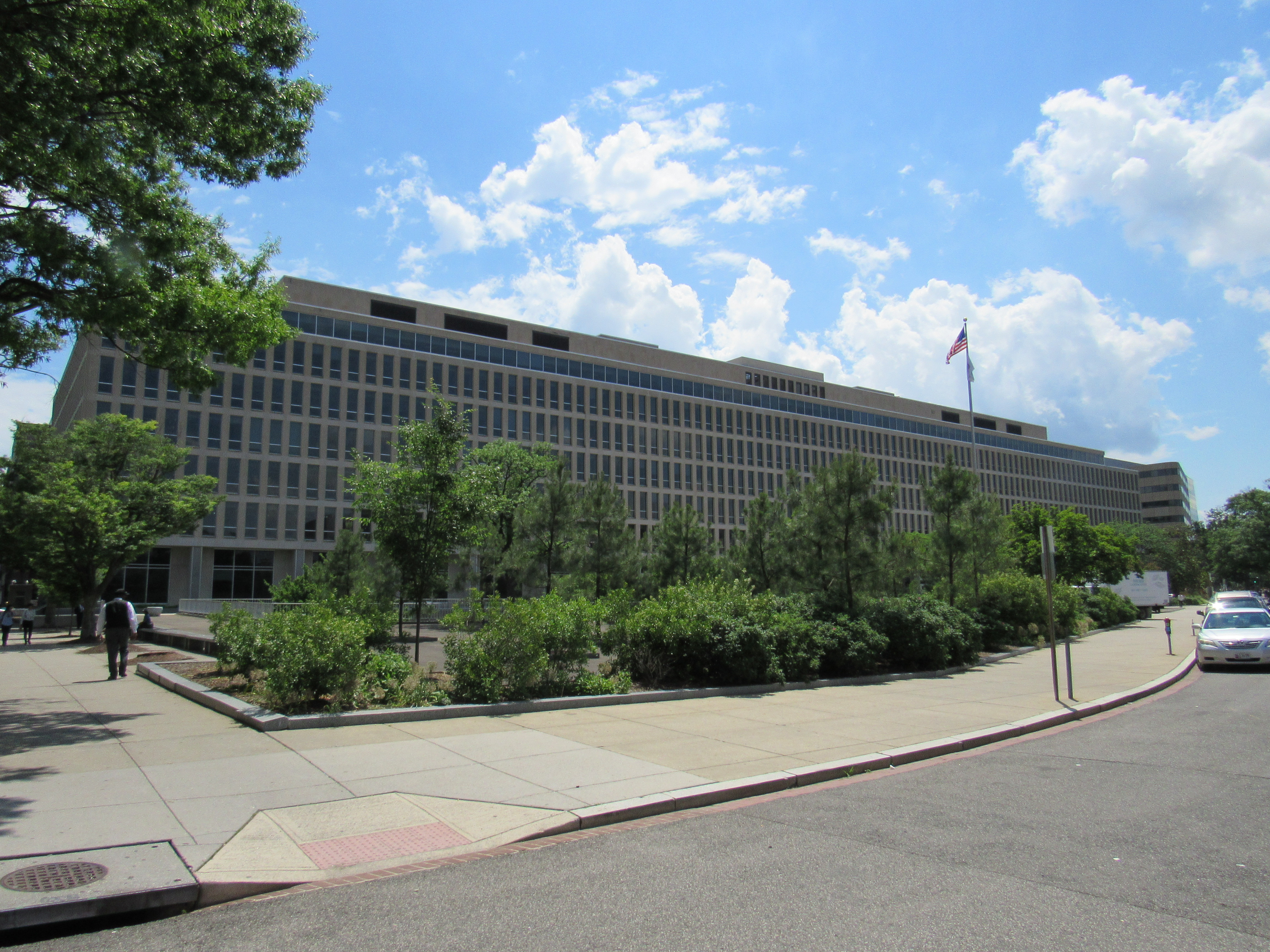
The Lyndon Baines Johnson Department of Education Building

The Constitution does not mention education, and the Tenth Amendment to the Constitution has been interpreted to give authority over education to the states. Regulation and funding of education is primarily handled by state and local governments, and the federal government provides only 8% of K-12 education funding in the United States. Congress does not have direct authority over education, so federal education policy is enforced by requiring compliance in order to receive federal funding. As a result, independent schools are not subject to federal education policy unless they are recipients of federal funding. In some cases, federal court rulings may influence education policy by striking down certain practices as unconstitutional. Schools in Washington, D.C. operate under the jurisdiction of the federal government. Federal education laws are codified as part of Title 20 of the United States Code.

The Department of Education carries out the education policy of the United States. The stated mission of the department is to "promote student achievement and preparation for global competitiveness by fostering educational excellence and ensuring equal access". The existence of the Department of Education is controversial, with notable Republicans such as Ronald Reagan and Donald Trump criticizing it for expanding the federal government and the Republican Party platform at times calling for its abolition. Other executive departments also contribute to education. The Department of Defense Education Activity and the Bureau of Indian Education operate federally run school systems. Within the Department of State, the Bureau of Educational and Cultural Affairs facilitates student exchange programs for foreign students to study in the United States and American students to study abroad.

== History ==
=== Early history ===
Under the Articles of Confederation, the Congress of the Confederation was responsible for overseeing the territories of the United States. Under this authority, Congress passed the earliest national laws addressing education. The Land Ordinance of 1785 set aside land for the construction of schools in the west, and the Northwest Ordinance of 1787 authorized the Northwest Territory to construct schools. The Department of Education was first established in 1867 to collect statistics on education in the United States, though it was demoted to the Office of Education and moved into the Department of the Interior the following year. The Civil Rights Act of 1875 guaranteed access to public schools regardless of race, but the Supreme Court ruled that it was unconstitutional in the Civil Rights Cases in 1883. The court also ruled that separate but equal facilities were constitutional in the 1896 case Plessy v. Ferguson.

The Morrill Land-Grant Acts provided for the creation of land-grant universities. The first Morrill Land-Grant Act was enacted in 1862, granting federal land to each state, the profits from which were to be used to construct agricultural and mechanical schools. The second Morrill Land-Grant Act was enacted in 1890, expanding on this program with additional funding and by requiring admission of African Americans. Many states created separate universities for African American students, some of which became historically black colleges and universities. Congress increased federal funding for land-grand universities with the Adams Act in 1906, the Nelson Amendment in 1907, and the Smith–Lever Act of 1914. The Smith–Hughes Act of 1917 amended the Smith–Lever Act to provide funding for vocational education in high schools.

=== New Deal and World War II ===
In 1931, President Herbert Hoover's National Advisory Committee on Education produced a report on the federal role in education, advocating federal funding but rejecting an oversight role for the federal government. However, the federal government's role in education expanded with the New Deal programs enacted in response to the Great Depression. The Roosevelt administration provided one-time grants to support struggling schools, supported teachers through the New Deal's work relief programs, and provided for the construction and repair of school buildings through public works programs. Despite these measures, education was not a major priority of the administration, and many benefits to school systems were incidental to the New Deal programs. The New Deal programs were intended to be temporary, and they did not increase the role of federal government in education.

During and after World War II, Congress enacted new relief and benefits programs. The Lanham Act of 1940 was amended in 1941 to provide funding for the construction and operation of schools. The G.I. Bill was enacted in 1944 provided many benefits for veterans, including financial aid for education. Impact Aid laws in 1950 provided further benefits for American citizens and communities affected by the war. The benefits provided by these programs proved longer lasting than those of the New Deal. Several additional changes to education policy took place in 1946. The George–Barden Act was enacted to expand federal funding for vocational training in high schools, the National School Lunch Act of 1946 provided assistance for students to obtain school meals, and President Truman assigned a commission to write the Higher Education for American Democracy report.

=== Desegregation and the Great Society ===
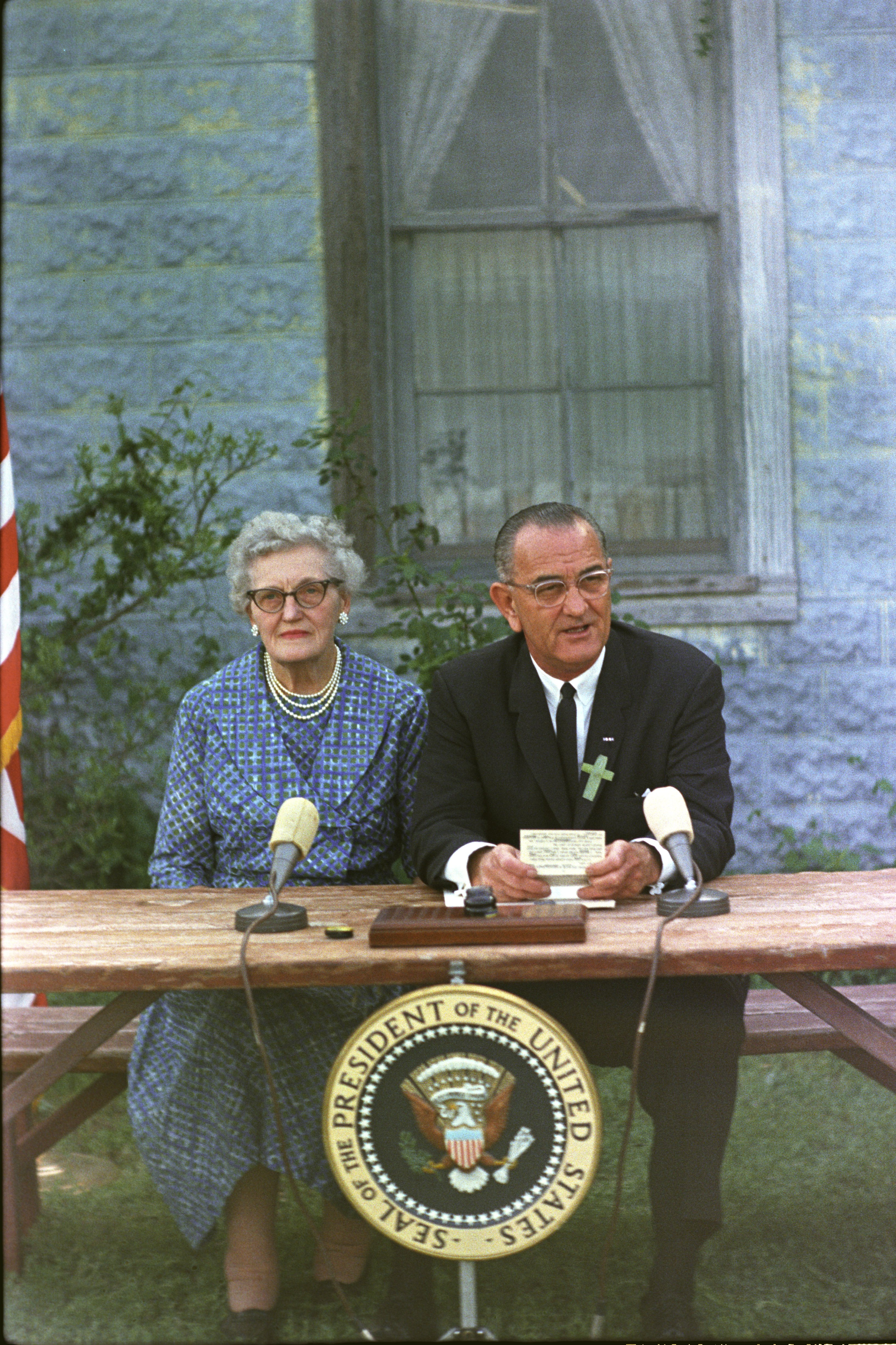
President Lyndon B. Johnson at the signing of the ESEA with his childhood schoolteacher. (1965)

Prior to 1954, schools were often segregated by race in the United States, and the Supreme Court had ruled segregation constitutional in the 1896 decision Plessy v. Ferguson. In the mid-20th century, the Supreme Court's stance began to change and it delivered a series of rulings that limited the constitutionality of segregation. In 1954, segregation in public schools was struck down entirely with Brown v. Board of Education. This decision faced strong backlash in southern states, and President Eisenhower established a military presence in Little Rock, Arkansas to enforce desegregation of public schools. Desegregation efforts continued to be enforced by the federal government through legal action for several decades afterward.

Federal oversight of education was moved to the newly created Department of Health, Education, and Welfare in 1953. Following the launch of Sputnik 1 in 1957, Senator J. Lister Hill gathered support for a new education bill by marketing it as a defense bill on the advice of a Senate clerk. The National Defense Education Act was enacted in 1958 to better equip the United States in competition with the Soviet Union. The bill implemented a student loan program, provided funding for science, math, and foreign language instruction, and expanded college services such as libraries.

The Johnson administration sought to improve quality of life in the United States through the Great Society program and the War on Poverty. Education was seen as the most reliable way to support the poor long term, and federal education policy was overhauled in the 1960s. The Vocational Education Act of 1963 was enacted to overhaul the Smith-Hughes Act and expand the scope of federal funding for vocational education. The Higher Education Act of 1965 was passed to increase funding for universities and help disadvantaged students afford tuition. The Civil Rights Act of 1964 was also passed as part of the Great Society program. It prohibited racial discrimination in any program receiving federal funding and provided enforcement for the desegregation of public schools. Federal funding in southern states was made contingent on desegregation, and the Department of Health, Education, and Welfare set quotas for integration rates in the late 1960s.

The Elementary and Secondary Education Act of 1965 was passed to overhaul federal oversight of K-12 education in the United States, providing federal funding to support disadvantaged students and hire more qualified teachers. The act was amended in 1967 to include additional provisions, such as dropout prevention, funding for disabled children, and new school libraries. The Bilingual Education Act was also passed to provide support for students of limited English proficiency. The passage of the Elementary and Secondary Education Act was contentious at the time, as it represented a major expansion of the federal government's role in education. The act gradually gained support among conservative members of Congress over the following decade, with reauthorization being nearly unanimous in the 1970s. The Head Start program was created in 1965 to supplement school aid and provide daycare for children of low income families.

=== Late-20th century reforms ===
During the 1970s, the federal government took an increasingly authoritative role in education policy, imposing regulations directly instead of incentivizing state and local governments to create them. The Education Amendments of 1972 made several changes to the American education system, including the implementation of Title IX, which prohibits discrimination on the basis of sex in schools that receive federal funding. The Department of Health, Education, and Welfare developed a detailed list of regulations that school systems were required to follow in order to comply with Title IX. The Education for All Handicapped Children Act was passed in 1975 to provide equal access to education for students with physical and mental disabilities. Protections for privacy rights were enacted through the Family Educational Rights and Privacy Act in 1974, which gave students and parents control over what information is released from educational records.

The Department of Education was reestablished and given cabinet status in 1980. Its creation was criticized by then-candidate Ronald Reagan during the 1980 presidential election. Under the Reagan administration, deregulation of education became a priority. Education funding was cut substantially after Reagan took office, and abolition of the Department of Education was considered. In 1983, the National Commission on Excellence in Education produced the report A Nation at Risk, outlining issues with the American school system, and the publication increased demand for education reform. The Carl D. Perkins Vocational and Technical Education Act was enacted in 1984 to reform vocational education, designed to support students that needed assistance.

President George H. W. Bush led the Charlottesville Education Summit in 1989, meeting with 49 of the 50 state governors to form a national education policy. The Education for All Handicapped Children Act was updated in 1990 as the Individuals with Disabilities Education Act. The Goals 2000: Educate America Act was enacted in 1994 to set education standards for states to receive additional federal funding. It required states to develop improvement plans that outlined standards, testing, educator training, and mechanisms for accountability. The Elementary and Secondary Education Act was reauthorized that year as the Improving America's Schools Act of 1994, which increased the requirements for standards and assessment in math and language arts.

=== 21st century ===
President George W. Bush oversaw significant education reform in 2002 with the enactment of the No Child Left Behind Act. This amendment to the Elementary and Secondary Education Act established national requirements to implement standardized testing in schools and penalized schools that did not achieve Adequate Yearly Progress. Reforms under Bush were emphasized as promoting accountability, contrasting with the messaging of opportunity used by Johnson in the 1960s. The Individuals with Disabilities Education Act was also reauthorized as IDEA 2004, reforming Individualized Education Programs, setting requirements for special education teachers, and establishing procedures for discipline of students with disabilities.

The Race to the Top grant was established as part of the 2009 stimulus package to incentivize state and local governments to implement standards and teacher evaluation reforms. After losing much of its initial support, the No Child Left Behind Act was replaced by the Every Student Succeeds Act in 2015. Under this law, the requirements implemented by the No Child Left Behind Act were loosened and the responsibility of setting standards and assessments were returned to the states. The Bipartisan Safer Communities Act was enacted in 2022 to expand mental health services in schools.

President Donald Trump sought during his second term to dismantle the U.S. Department of Education. He also attacked universities, seeking to revoke federal funding in response to alleged civil rights violations related to antisemitism in the 2024 pro-Palestinian campus protests, block and deport international students at U.S. institutions, and rescind federal research funding.

== Elementary and secondary education ==
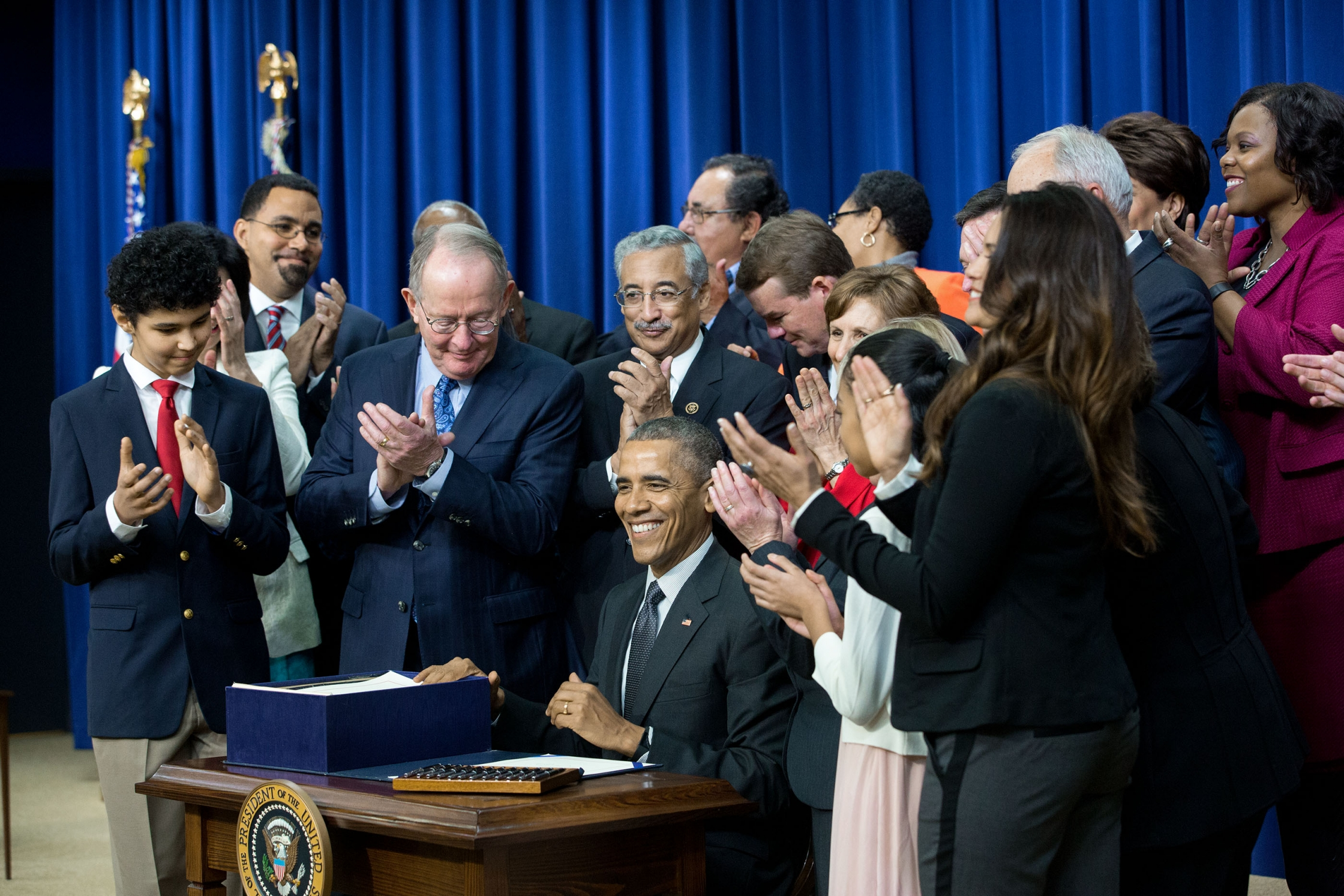
President Obama at the signing of the ESSA. (2015)

Elementary and secondary education in the United States is governed by the Elementary and Secondary Education Act and its subsequent amendments. The largest component of the Elementary and Secondary Education Act is Title I, which provides federal funding for schools in low income areas. Other titles in the Elementary and Secondary Education Act provide for libraries, instructional materials, teachers, educational research and development, and administrative spending for state education agencies. Under the Bilingual Education Act, the Elementary and Secondary Education Act also provides support for students of limited English proficiency. Since 2015, the Elementary and Secondary Education Act has operated under the Every Student Succeeds Act. This revision of the act continues to provide financial assistance for underprivileged students, requires academic standards designed for college and career preparation, and provides support to increase access to preschool.

The federal government has provided funding for schools through the Elementary and Secondary Education Act since its enactment in 1965. Title I of the act provides for federal funding of schools in low income areas. In 2011, Title I made up 43% of federal elementary and secondary education spending, and the majority of school districts receive Title I funding. As of 2021, federal funding pays for about 8% of all expenses in primary and secondary education. Federal funding is provided by several government agencies, including the Department of Education, the Head Start program of the Department of Health and Human Services, and the school lunch program of the Department of Agriculture.

The federal government does not maintain national academic standards or a nationwide curriculum, and the Department of Education is legally prohibited from creating any program that directs the curriculum of schools. The department does conduct the National Assessment of Educational Progress to monitor the progress of educational standards in the United States. All other standardized tests are organized by state governments or private entities. The No Child Left Behind Act required each state to implement a standardized test program in 2001, and this requirement was reauthorized by the Every Student Succeeds Act with looser requirements in 2015. Under the Obama administration, schools were incentivized to adopt the Common Core standards through No Child Left Behind waivers and Race to the Top grants.

=== Child care ===
The Office of Child Care is responsible for overseeing federal child care policy in the United States, authorized under the Child Care and Development Block Grant Act of 1990 and subsequent amendments. It funds early care and after school programs by providing grants to state governments through the Child Care and Development Fund. In 2021, the fund provided $9.5 billion for child care programs. The Office of Child Care also implements health and safety standards, eligibility policies, and quality improvement efforts for child care programs. The federal government also provides for several early learning programs. Head Start programs provide child care services for children up to age five in low-income families. Nita M. Lowey 21st Century Community Learning Centers provide after-school programs in low income areas.

Previously, child care had been provided by the Emergency Nursery Schools program as part of the Works Progress Administration of the New Deal, implemented in 1933. These nursery schools provided child care and educational services for the children of unemployed parents. Federal child care was expanded in 1954 when child care was made tax deductible. The Comprehensive Child Development Act was passed in 1971 to implement a national child care system, but it was vetoed by President Richard Nixon.

=== Nonpublic schools ===
The Office of Non-Public Education is responsible for overseeing and supporting private schools. Through the Elementary and Secondary Education Act, it serves as a liaison between the Department of Education and the nonpublic school community, providing guidance and support to nonpublic schools. The Department of Education does not have any direct authority over nonpublic schools or homeschooling, and it is prohibited from creating any program that would assert this authority. The department generally does not provide financial support specific to nonpublic schools or to parents that enroll their children in nonpublic schools. However, all federal benefits available to public schools are also available to nonpublic schools. Nonpublic schools must comply with federal civil rights laws if they receive federal funding.

The Supreme Court ruled that the right to choose private education is protected by the Fourteenth Amendment in the 1925 case Pierce v. Society of Sisters. Regulation of religious schools is restricted by the Free Exercise Clause of the First Amendment, while government support of religious schools is restricted by the Establishment Clause. The court ruled that school voucher systems are constitutional in the 2002 case Zelman v. Simmons-Harris.

=== Safety ===
School safety emerged as a policy area in the 1970s, during a period of rising youth crime. The Drug Free Schools and Communities Act was passed in 1986 to create drug prevention programs in schools, and a 1992 re-authorization of the Juvenile Justice and Delinquency Prevention Act created programs to prevent gang membership among students. Several school safety laws were passed in 1994, including the Gun-Free Schools Act of 1994, the Safe Schools Act, and the Safe and Drug-Free Schools and Communities Act, all of which set restrictions on prohibited items or provided support for schools to enforce safety measures. In 1998, the Safe Schools Initiative was created, including the COPS in Schools program and the Safe Schools/Healthy Students Initiative. The Secure Our Schools program was launched in 2001 to update school security technology, and Project Sentry was launched in 2002 to limit juvenile access to firearms. The Every Student Succeeds Act consolidated school safety grant programs and eliminated grants that were not receiving federal funding. The STOP School Violence Act was passed in 2018. The Bipartisan Safer Communities Act was passed in 2022

=== Students' rights ===
==== Constitutional rights ====
Students retain the right to freedom of speech while in school. The Supreme Court affirmed that this right exists so long as it does not cause a "substantial disruption" in the 1969 case Tinker v. Des Moines Independent Community School District. It ruled that this protection does not extend to vulgar speech in the 1986 case Bethel School District v. Fraser or the promotion of drug use in the 2007 case Morse v. Frederick. The right to free speech protects students from dress codes used to stifle specific viewpoints or disproportionately punish students for their beliefs. Schools also cannot punish students for speech that takes place outside of school and is unrelated to school. Schools may censor content in school projects, such as student publications, as found in the 1988 case Hazelwood School District v. Kuhlmeier.

Students also retain Fourth Amendment rights while in school. The Supreme Court affirmed that students possess freedom from unreasonable search and seizure in the 1985 case New Jersey v. T. L. O, but a reasonable search may take place at the lower a standard of reasonable suspicion. The court also ruled that drug testing in extracurricular activities is legal in the 1995 case Vernonia School District 47J v. Acton and the 2002 case Board of Education v. Earls. Privacy of educational records is protected by the Family Educational Rights and Privacy Act. The federal government does not prohibit school corporal punishment, and the Supreme Court ruled that states may permit it in the 1977 case Ingraham v. Wright.

The presence of religion in public schools is governed by the First Amendment. Under the First Amendment, public schools may neither enforce nor prohibit religious activities and practices. Students and teachers are guaranteed the right to practice their religion in any way that does not interfere with schooling. The Equal Access Act guarantees religious student groups the same rights and permissions as secular student groups. The teaching of creationism was found to be unconstitutional in the 1987 case Edwards v. Aguillard. School prayer and school Bible readings have been the subject of much debate in education policy. The court ruled that public schools cannot lead students in prayer in the 1962 case Engel v. Vitale, and that they cannot lead Bible readings in the 1963 case Abington School District v. Schempp. This restriction was extended to student-lead prayers in the 2000 case Santa Fe Independent School District v. Doe. A School Prayer Amendment has been proposed many times in Congress since the Engel v. Vitale ruling.

==== Legal protections ====
The Civil Rights Act of 1964 prohibits discrimination on the basis of race, color, religion, sex, or national origin in schools. Schools in the United States were racially segregated until the mid-20th century. The Supreme Court ruled that racial segregation violated the rights guaranteed by the Constitution in Brown v. Board of Education, overturning the 1896 decision Plessy v. Ferguson, which had allowed segregation under a doctrine of separate but equal. The Civil Rights Act of 1964 granted the federal government additional powers to enforce desegregation of schools. Title IX of the Education Amendments of 1972 guarantees women equal access to all educational programs that receive federal funding. The Bureau of Indian Education is responsible for overseeing education in Indian reservations. The Supreme Court ruled that English language learners are entitled to language assistance under the Civil Rights Act in the 1974 case Lau v. Nichols, and this right was codified in the Equal Educational Opportunities Act of 1974.

The Individuals with Disabilities Education Act governs protections and accommodations for students with disabilities in public schools. Students with disabilities are entitled to the least restrictive environment, with more restrictive measures such as separate classes or schooling for the disabled limited to when it is necessary. Mechanisms guaranteed to students with disabilities include Individualized Education Programs that customize students' education to fit individual needs and Free Appropriate Public Education that provides additional educational services when necessary. The Individuals with Disabilities Education Act also entitles students a fair evaluation process to determine proper placement. Parents are entitled under the act to be informed about and provide input regarding their child's accommodations. Grants authorized under this act are processed through the Office of Special Education Programs. The Individuals with Disabilities Education Act has been in effect since 1990. It succeeded the Education for All Handicapped Children Act, which had been enacted in 1975. Students with disabilities are also guaranteed protection in public schools through Title II of the Americans with Disabilities Act.

== Higher education ==
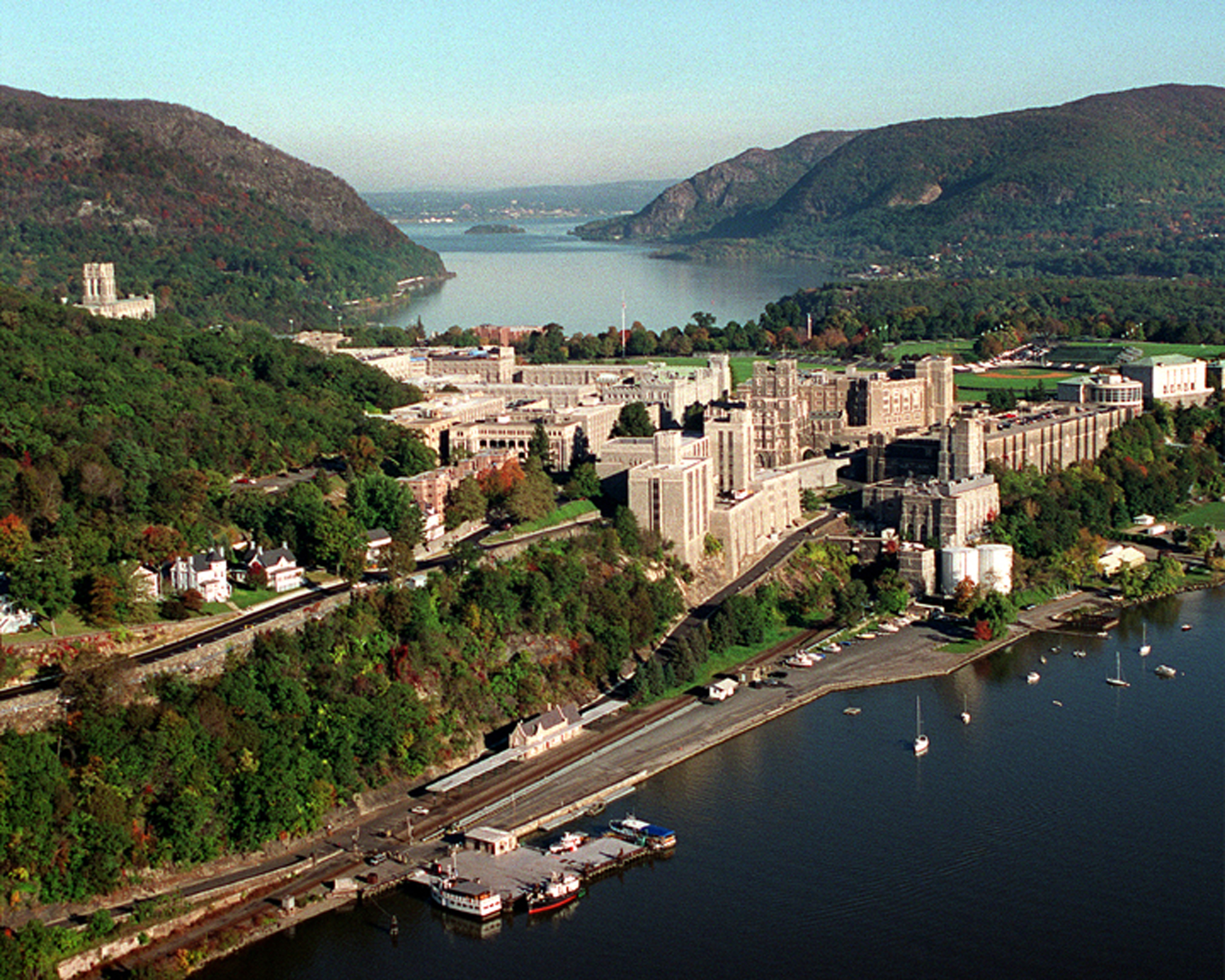
Campus of the federally run United States Military Academy

Federal higher education policy is primarily governed by the Higher Education Act of 1965 and its subsequent amendments. Universities in the United States are typically run by state governments or privately owned, and federal involvement is limited. Federal academies are run directly by the federal government, and the United States service academies are organized as executive agencies within the government. Universities located in Washington, D.C. are federally chartered. The Department of Education oversees campus safety in universities through the Clery Act of 1990, which requires all higher education institutions that receive federal funding to record and report crime statistics on campus. The Supreme Court ruled that excluding religious student groups while funding secular student groups was unconstitutional in the 1995 case Rosenberger v. University of Virginia.

The Civil Rights Act of 1964 prohibits racial discrimination in colleges, and Title IX prohibits gender discrimination. The Supreme Court ruled in the 1978 case Regents of the University of California v. Bakke that affirmative action may be used to support racial minorities in the application process, but the use of racial quotas violated the Civil Rights Act. The court also ruled that single-sex admissions are unconstitutional in the 1982 case Mississippi University for Women v. Hogan. The court affirmed that race may still be considered as a factor as long as each student is considered on an individual basis in the 2003 case Grutter v. Bollinger.

=== Financial aid ===
Under the Higher Education Act, the federal government provides financial support for qualifying institutions and students. The Federal Student Aid office is responsible for financial support programs, and it provides student financial aid in the form of grants, scholarships, loans, and work-study jobs for qualifying students. Common grants provided by the federal government include Pell Grants, Federal Supplemental Educational Opportunity Grants, and TEACH Grants. Spending on higher education made up about 2% of the federal budget in 2017, including $27.7 billion in Pell Grants, $26.4 billion in research funding, and $13.6 billion in veterans' benefits. The FAFSA form is used by students seeking financial aid to determine eligibility.

Additional benefits are provided for military veterans and their families. Reserve Officers' Training Corps scholarships are awarded on the basis of merit. The Department of Veteran's Affairs provides benefits for veterans, their widows, and their dependents through the G.I. Bill and subsequent amendments. Active service members are permitted reduced interest or deferment on student loans. Children of soldiers killed while serving in the Iraq War or the War in Afghanistan are automatically eligible for the maximum amount provided by Pell Grants.

== Public opinion ==
In 2001, 94% of Americans considered education to be a top priority or high priority issue for the federal government to address, ranking higher than any other issue. In 2015, a majority of Americans supported a large role for federal government in education and approved of government performance in the area. The Department of Education had an approval rate of 44% at this time and a disapproval rate of 50%, with Democrats more likely than Republicans to approve of the department. In 2019, 53% of Americans supported stronger measures from the federal government to reduce racial segregation in schools, while 45% did not.

The No Child Left Behind Act was initially popular upon enactment with bipartisan support, but it later became controversial among the public. Most Americans had only limited knowledge of the law's provisions. In 2012, 16% of Americans believed it made public education better, 29% believed it make public education worse, and 38% believed it did not make a significant difference. Positions on higher education policy have become increasingly politicized and polarized in the 21st century. Republicans are more likely to support policies that promote efficiency in higher education, while Democrats are more likely to support policies that promote opportunity for prospective students.

== See also ==
- List of United States education acts
- History of education in the United States
