= Vocational Education Act of 1963 =

1963 United States federal law expanding vocational education

- Long title: An Act to strengthen and improve the quality of vocational education, to expand vocational education opportunities in the United States, to extend certain existing education programs, and for other purposes
- Acronyms (colloquial): VEA
- Nicknames: Perkins Bill
- Enacted by: the 88th United States Congress
- Effective: December 18, 1963

Citations
- Public law: Pub. L. 88–210
- Statutes at Large: 77 Stat. 403

Legislative history
- Introduced in the House of Representatives as H.R. 4955 on March 18, 1963; Committee consideration by House Education and Labor; Passed the House on August 6, 1963 (377–21); Passed the Senate on October 8, 1963 (82–4); Signed into law by President Lyndon B. Johnson on December 18, 1963

Major amendments
- Education Amendments of 1972

The Vocational Education Act of 1963 (VEA), Pub. L. 88-210, is a United States federal education law that substantially expanded federal support for vocational education. Enacted by the 88th United States Congress and signed into law by President Lyndon B. Johnson on December 18, 1963, the Act authorized new matching grants to states to improve existing vocational programs, develop new offerings, and extend occupational training opportunities for youth and adults. The law also extended the National Defense Education Act and certain federal impact-aid programs for schools serving large numbers of children from military or other federally connected families.

The Act superseded earlier categorical funding schemes rooted in the Smith–Hughes Act of 1917 and the George-Barden Act of 1946 by broadening the definition of vocational education and extending eligibility beyond traditional agriculture, home economics, and trades programs at the secondary level. It encouraged the creation of "area vocational schools" serving multiple districts, work-study programs for students needing part-time employment, and training or retraining for adults already in or entering the labor force. Contemporary observers and later historians have treated the 1963 statute as a major turning point in federal vocational education policy and one of the most influential vocational education laws of the twentieth century.

The Vocational Education Act of 1963 was amended and expanded by the Vocational Education Amendments of 1968, the Education Amendments of 1976, and the Carl D. Perkins Vocational and Technical Education Act of 1984, among other laws. As extensively amended, Public Law 88-210 is now cited as the Carl D. Perkins Career and Technical Education Act of 2006 and provides the statutory basis for federal career and technical education grants authorized in chapter 44 of Title 20 of the United States Code.

== Background ==
=== Early federal vocational education laws ===
Federal support for vocational education in the United States dates to the Smith–Hughes Act of 1917, which provided categorical grants to states for vocational agriculture, home economics, and trade and industrial education in secondary schools. That framework was expanded through the George-Barden Act of 1946 and related measures, which authorized additional funds for vocational training but largely preserved separate statutory categories tied to particular occupational fields.

By the late 1950s, demographic changes, technological shifts, and concerns about economic competitiveness led policy makers and vocational educators to question whether the existing statutory structure was adequate. The National Defense Education Act of 1958 signaled a renewed federal interest in education tied to national priorities, but it focused primarily on academic subjects rather than occupational training. At the same time, rising school enrollment, higher rates of high school completion, and growing concern about youth unemployment highlighted perceived gaps in vocational offerings for both in-school and out-of-school populations.

=== Kennedy administration initiatives ===
During the 1960 presidential campaign, Senator John F. Kennedy received support from the American Vocational Association (AVA) after pledging to back expanded federal aid for vocational education. Once in office, Kennedy established a panel of consultants in 1962 to review existing vocational education laws and recommend changes. The panel urged a large increase in the federal contribution to vocational education, the abandonment of older categorical formulas, and new funding streams reaching a wider range of students and programs.

In parallel, the AVA and allied groups drafted legislative proposals they believed would reflect the panel's recommendations and the interests of vocational educators. Their draft eventually informed H.R. 4955, which became known informally as the "Perkins Bill" after the chair of the relevant House subcommittee, while the administration submitted its own vocational education proposal as part of a broader education package (H.R. 3000 and S. 580).

== Legislative history ==
=== Consideration in Congress ===
H.R. 4955 was introduced in the House of Representatives on March 18, 1963, during the first session of the 88th Congress and referred to the Committee on Education and Labor. The bill proposed to consolidate and modify existing vocational education laws while authorizing new federal matching grants to states. The House General Subcommittee on Education held hearings on Title V-A of H.R. 3000 (the administration bill) and on H.R. 4955, taking testimony from federal officials, state administrators, business groups, and professional associations.

Following revisions in committee, H.R. 4955 was reported favorably and debated on the House floor. Contemporary reports describe strong bipartisan support for the general purpose of expanding vocational education, coupled with debate about the appropriate federal-state funding balance and the relationship between vocational and general education curricula. The House passed the bill by a wide margin in August 1963.

In the Senate, the legislation was referred to the Committee on Labor and Public Welfare, which recommended passage with amendments. Final negotiations reconciled differences between the House and Senate versions, including provisions related to the extension of the National Defense Education Act and impact-aid statutes. The Senate approved the conference report in December 1963, and H.R. 4955 was cleared for the President.

=== Enactment ===
President Johnson signed the bill into law on December 18, 1963, less than a month after assuming the presidency following Kennedy's assassination. In prepared remarks at the signing ceremony, Johnson framed the Vocational Education Act as part of an effort to equip Americans with skills for an evolving economy and to address youth unemployment and underemployment.

== Provisions ==
=== Purpose and funding structure ===
Part A of the Act declared its purpose to be the authorization of federal grants to states to maintain, extend, and improve existing programs of vocational education and to develop new programs, including opportunities for youths needing part-time employment and for adults requiring training or retraining. The statute required states to submit state plans and to match federal funds with state and local contributions, thereby reinforcing a cooperative federal-state model.

According to contemporary legislative summaries, the Act authorized $60 million for the first fiscal year after enactment, rising to $22 million by fiscal year 1967, with specified levels for intermediate years. These funds were to be distributed under formula grants, largely based on population and relative per capita income, and could be used for a variety of vocational education purposes consistent with state plans.

=== Eligible programs and populations ===
The Vocational Education Act broadened the scope of federally supported vocational education beyond the traditional high school population. It authorized federal assistance for programs serving:

- students in secondary schools preparing for initial entry into the labor market;
- school leavers and high school graduates seeking training to enter the labor force;
- individuals already in the labor force who needed training or retraining for employment stability or advancement; and
- persons whose age or other circumstances made them especially in need of vocational education.

The law permitted expenditures for curriculum development, instructional materials, guidance and counseling, equipment, and related services necessary to support vocational programs. States could also use funds for specialized programs for individuals with disabilities and for other groups identified in their plans.

=== Area vocational schools and facilities ===
One notable feature of the Act was explicit support for "area vocational schools" serving multiple local school districts, often on a regional basis. Federal funds could be used to assist in the construction, modernization, or expansion of such facilities where they would make vocational training more accessible, particularly in rural or sparsely populated areas. Subsequent appropriation acts, such as the Departments of Labor and Health, Education, and Welfare Appropriation Act, 1965, earmarked substantial sums for carrying out these provisions and for related vocational programs.

=== Work–study and ancillary services ===
Section 13 of the Act authorized federal participation in work–study programs providing part-time employment to students in vocational education who needed income to remain in school. The law also permitted expenditures for guidance services, counseling, testing, and other supportive activities intended to help students select and succeed in vocational programs. Business and education organizations responded by issuing policy statements advising local educators how to take advantage of the new opportunities for programs such as business and office occupations.

=== Research and teacher education ===
The Act provided for vocational education research, teacher preparation, and in-service training, recognizing that expanded programs would require additional qualified personnel. It supported cooperative efforts among state education agencies, teacher education institutions, and local school systems to develop new instructional methods and to strengthen vocational teacher education programs.

== Implementation and amendments ==
=== Early implementation ===
Responsibility for administering the Vocational Education Act rested with the U.S. Office of Education in the Department of Health, Education, and Welfare, working through designated state boards for vocational education. States submitted comprehensive state plans, sometimes requiring significant reorganization of existing vocational structures to meet federal requirements and to take advantage of new program categories.

Early analyses reported rapid growth in the number and scale of area vocational schools, expanded offerings for out-of-school youth and adults, and heightened attention to vocational guidance and counseling. Federal oversight included both programmatic review and fiscal auditing of state expenditures under the Act.

=== Vocational Education Amendments of 1968 ===
The Vocational Education Amendments of 1968, Pub. L. 90-576, restructured and expanded the 1963 Act. Among other changes, the 1968 amendments redesignated the Act's parts as separate titles, revised the declaration of purpose, and added specific provisions for disadvantaged and handicapped persons, work–study programs, and cooperative vocational education. They also strengthened requirements for statewide planning and evaluation and increased authorized appropriations.

The 1968 law is often viewed as marking a second phase in federal vocational education policy, building on the 1963 Act's broader conception of vocational education while responding to concerns about poverty, civil rights, and the changing labor market.

=== Later reauthorizations and Perkins legislation ===
Congress further amended the vocational education statutes in the Education Amendments of 1976 and other legislation, adding emphasis on sex equity, program evaluation, and linkages between vocational and academic education. In 1984, the Carl D. Perkins Vocational and Technical Education Act (Pub. L. 98-524) substantially revised the existing framework while retaining the 1963 Act's statutory base, shifting federal priorities toward program improvement, special populations, and accountability.

Subsequent reauthorizations in 1990, 1998, 2006, and 2018 continued to amend the original Public Law 88-210, with the 2006 reauthorization styled the Carl D. Perkins Career and Technical Education Act of 2006. As a result, the Vocational Education Act of 1963 survives in heavily amended form as the core federal statute governing career and technical education grants to states and local recipients.

== Impact and assessment ==
Scholars generally agree that the Vocational Education Act of 1963 marked a major shift in federal involvement in vocational education. By replacing narrow categorical programs with a broader, population-focused approach and by greatly increasing authorized funding levels, the Act gave states greater flexibility to design programs serving high school students, school leavers, and adults. One early analysis concluded that the law had "greater implications for vocational education than any previous federal measure," particularly because it encouraged regional planning and cooperative arrangements among school districts.

The Act also had significant implications for vocational teacher education and for the relationship between vocational and general education. Historians of vocational education have argued that the 1963 and 1968 statutes helped move federal policy away from a narrow focus on specific trades and toward a broader conception of occupational preparation, even as debates continued over the appropriate balance between vocational skill training and general education. At the same time, critics have contended that vocational programs subsidized under the Act sometimes reinforced patterns of tracking and social stratification, disproportionately enrolling students from lower-income or marginalized groups in programs leading to less lucrative occupations.

Professional organizations such as the AVA and the Policies Commission for Business and Economic Education welcomed the Act as an opportunity to expand and modernize vocational curricula, particularly in business and office occupations and in technologically oriented fields. However, they also raised concerns about the administrative complexity of federal requirements and the need for adequate state and local matching funds.

Over time, commentators have linked the Vocational Education Act of 1963 and its successors to broader shifts in federal education policy, including increasing reliance on conditional grants, growing expectations for accountability, and continued debate over the purposes of secondary and postsecondary education in a changing economy.

== See also ==
- Vocational education in the United States
- Smith–Hughes Act
- National Defense Education Act
- Carl D. Perkins Vocational and Technical Education Act
- Career and technical education
- Education policy of the United States
