= Carl D. Perkins Vocational and Technical Education Act =

- Long title: An Act to strengthen and expand the economic base of the Nation, develop human resources, reduce structural unemployment, increase productivity, and strengthen the Nation’s defense capabilities by assisting the States to expand, improve, and update high-quality programs of vocational-technical education, and for other purposes.
- Enacted by: the 98th United States Congress
- Effective: October 19, 1984

Citations
- Public law: Pub. L. 98–524
- Statutes at Large: 98 Stat. 2845

Codification
- Acts amended: Vocational Education Act of 1963

Legislative history
- Introduced in the House as H.R. 4164 by Rep. Carl D. Perkins (D–KY) on October 19, 1983; Committee consideration by House Education and Labor; Senate Labor and Human Resources; Passed the House on March 8, 1984 (373–4); Passed the Senate on August 9, 1984 (Passed by voice vote); Reported by the joint conference committee on October 2, 1984; agreed to by the Senate on October 3, 1984 (Agreed to Conference Report by Voice Vote); Signed into law by President Ronald Reagan on October 19, 1984

The Carl D. Perkins Vocational and Technical Education Act was first authorized by the federal government in 1984 and reauthorized in 1990 (Perkins II), 1998 (Perkins III), 2006 (Perkins IV), and 2018 (Perkins V). Named for Carl D. Perkins, the act aims to increase the quality of technical education within the United States in order to help the economy.

On July 31, 2018, President Donald Trump signed into law the re-authorization of the Act of 2018. The new law, the Strengthening Career and Technical Education for the 21st Century (Perkins V) Act, was passed almost unanimously by Congress.

The Perkins IV re-authorization included three major areas of revision:

- Using the term "career and technical education" instead of "vocational education"
- Maintaining the Tech Prep program as a separate federal funding stream within the legislation
- Maintaining state administrative funding at 5 percent of a state's allocation

The Perkins IV law also included new requirements for “programs of study” that link academic and technical content across secondary and post-secondary education, and strengthened local accountability provisions that will ensure continuous program improvement.

The Perkins Act provides $1.2 billion in federal support for career and technical education programs in all 50 States, including support for integrated career pathways programs. The law was extended through 2024.
