= Safe Schools Act =

Legislation in Ontario, Canada

The Safe Schools Act is an Ontario bill, implemented in 2000 to provide a definitive set of regulations for punishments that must be issued for students. The bill is often referred to as a zero-tolerance policy, however "the presence of mitigating factors in the Act and school board policies precludes it from being strictly defined as a zero tolerance regime". Nonetheless, the bill has been criticized for not providing enough flexibility to schools for disciplining students on a case-by-case basis, preferring instead mandatory suspensions for a wide range of behaviour including verbal abuse and physical violence. A report commissioned by the Ontario Human Rights Commission concluded that "there is a strong perception supported by some empirical evidence that the Act and school board policies are having a disproportionate impact on racial minority students, particularly Black students, and students with disabilities."

== External links and references ==
- Bill 81, The Safe Schools Act
