= Education Professions Development Act of 1967 =

The Education Professions Development Act (EPDA) of 1967 (P.L. 90-35) is an American statute which amended and extended the Title V of the Higher Education Act of 1965. The EPDA was intended to improve the quality of teaching and to help overcome the shortage of adequately trained teachers by implementing training and retraining programs. The act had the effect of attracting top quality people capable of improving education during short- and long-term assignments in the profession.

== Interdisciplinary Model Programs in the Arts for Children and Teachers ==
Through the Teacher Retraining Authorization of the EPDA, the Interdisciplinary Model Programs in the Arts for Children and Teachers (IMPACT) was established in 1970. Four arts education associations established a plan of operation for IMPACT. The purpose of the project was to demonstrate that school activities in the arts can transform the traditional curriculum into one that:

1. emphasizes the integration of the arts into the mainstream of human experience
2. aids students in becoming sensitive to the qualitative aspects of their own experiences as sources for artistic ideas
3. explores the similarities and differences in the ways that professionals in the arts develop their ideas
4. challenges students to make effective use of their creative resources

IMPACT was implemented in five locations ranging from single schools to a consortium of three school districts. When IMPACT ended in 1972, it was considered to have been successful in terms of its own goals. Teachers who were not arts specialists became more confident of their abilities to use the arts in teaching, and children had the opportunity to learn in an aesthetic environment. Test results indicate that students who participated in IMPACT programs were significantly above grade level in reading and other skills several years after their arts experiences. They also showed that students developed self-esteem through their arts experiences and that their attitudes toward school improved.
